= Mirishkor District =

Coordinates: 38°54′07″N 65°00′03″E

Mirishkor District Миришкорский район
- District
- Mirishkor tumani
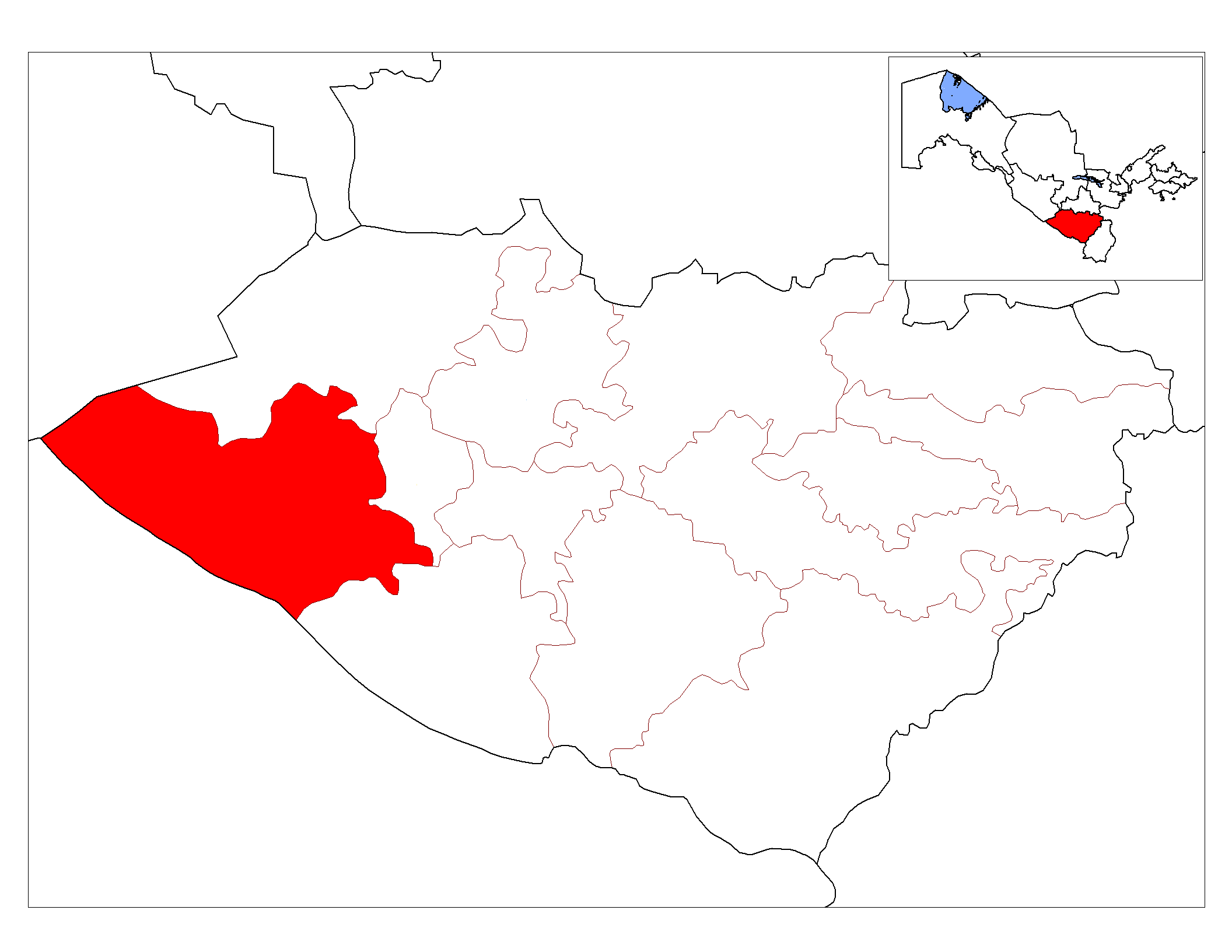
- Country: Uzbekistan
- Region: Qashqadaryo Region
- Capital: Yangi Mirishkor

Government
  - Hokim: Sherali Sanaev

Area
  - Total: 3,210 km^{2} (1,240 sq mi)

Population (2021)
  - Total: 121,500
  - Density: 37.9/km^{2} (98.0/sq mi)
- Time zone: UTC+5 (UZT)

Mirishkor District (Uzbek: Mirishkor/Миришкор; Tajik: Миришкор; Russian: Миришкар, romanized: Mirishkar) is a district of Qashqadaryo Region in Uzbekistan. The capital lies at the town Yangi Mirishkor. It has an area of 3,210 km^{2} (1,240 sq mi) and its population is 121,500 (2021 est.). The district consists of 3 urban-type settlements (Yangi Mirishkor, Jeynov, Pomuq) and 12 rural communities. It borders with Turkmenistan, Bukhara Region, Muborak District, Kasbi District, Nishon District.

== Climate ==
Mirishkor has a cold desert climate (Köppen climate classification BWk). The district has mild winters, but very hot and dry summers. The average June temperature is about 28 °C (82 °F).

== Economy ==
Natural resources include significant petroleum and natural gas reserves. Major agricultural activities include cotton, various crops and livestock.
