= Langar Ota Mausoleum =

- Langar ota maqbarasi
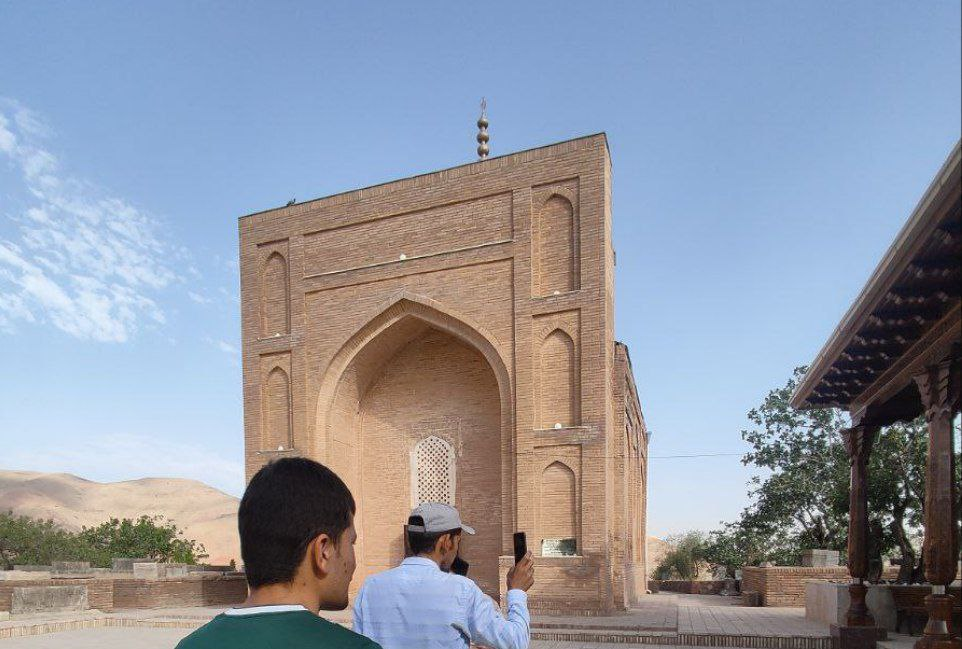
- Langar Ota mausoleum
- Interactive map of the Langar Ota Mausoleum area
- Alternative names: Shaykh Abulhasan Mausoleum

General information
- Type: Mausoleum
- Classification: Cultural heritage site
- Location: Kokbulok mahalla, Kamashi district, Kashkadarya region, Uzbekistan
- Coordinates: 38.68169°N 66.75807°E
- Year built: 15th century

Technical details
- Material: Baked bricks

The Langar Ota Mausoleum is a cultural heritage site in Uzbekistan. It is located in the Kokbulok mahalla of Qamashi District of Qashqadaryo region, and was built in the 15th century. Currently, this area is under the operational management of the Kashkadarya Regional Department of Cultural Heritage (on the basis of the state property right). It is entrusted to the “Waqf” charity foundation on the basis of a free use agreement. The Langar Ota Mausoleum was included in the National Register of Immovable Cultural Heritage Objects by the decision of the Cabinet of Ministers of the Republic of Uzbekistan on October 4, 2019. The Langar Ota Mausoleum is under state protection.

== Location ==
The Langar Ota Mausoleum is located in the Langar Ota pilgrimage site in Qamashi District of Qashqadaryo region. There is also a Langarota mosque in the pilgrimage site. The mausoleum was built on a hill one step away from the mosque.

== Structure ==
The mausoleum is surrounded by a cemetery, and a khilkhona (a place for meditation) is located 100 meters away from the tomb. This monument was built 100 years after the Langarota mosque was built. The architectural style of the mausoleum is very similar to that of the Khwaja Ahmad Yasawi mausoleum. The Langar Ota mausoleum is made of baked bricks, and the door and window arches are decorated with intricate patterns. There are 5 graves in the mausoleum, 3 of which have tombstones.

== Origin of the name ==
The word “Langar” means a shrine, cemetery or pilgrimage site, as well as a caravanserai, a caravan stop, or a place of blessing. The mausoleum was located in such an area in its own time.

The mausoleum is also known as the Shaykh Abulhasan Mausoleum because Abulhasan Ishqi and his relatives were buried there.

According to some legends, the name “Langar Ota” is considered to be the nickname of Shaykh Abulhasan.

== Research ==
According to the research of the historian Abdusobir Rayimkulov, the Langar Ota mausoleum contains the graves of Shaykh Abulhasan Ishqi, his son Shaykhzoda Muhammad Sodiq, and his grandson Abulhasan Okhund, all of whom were associated with the Ishqiya Sufi order. The fourth grave lacks a tombstone, and its occupant remains unidentified.

== Similar places ==
There is also a monument and a village with the same name in Chiroqchi district of Qashqadaryo region. The pilgrimage site there is popularly known as Yangi Langar (New Langar), and it is considered to be the second langar.

In addition, there is a Langar Ota pilgrimage site in Koshtepa district of Fergana region. This monument is under the control of the Fergana Regional Department of Cultural Heritage. The Langar Ota pilgrimage site includes a mausoleum. The monument was recorded as “Langar” in the archival documents of 1872.
