= Langarota Mosque =

Mosque in Qashqadaryo region, Uzbekistan

- Uzbek: Langarota masjidi

Religion
- Affiliation: Islam

Location
- Location: Qashqadaryo, Uzbekistan
- Interactive map of Langarota Mosque
- Coordinates: 38°40′54.038″N 66°45′29.205″E

Architecture
- Type: Mosque
- Style: Islamic architecture
- Completed: 1448

The Langarota Mosque is an architectural monument located in the village of Katta Langar in the Qashqadaryo region of Uzbekistan, dating back to the first half of the 16th century. The mosque is typical of the mountainous regions of Central Asia and consists of two rooms and a veranda at the entrance.

== History ==
According to historical sources, the mosque, popularly known as Khazrat Langar Ota, was built in the year 1448 by a man named Abul Hasan Sheikh. The construction of the mosque was carried out with the support of charitable organizations and patrons.

== Location ==
The Langar Ota Mosque is situated on a hill in the village of Langar in the Qamashi district of Uzbekistan. The village is located within the Hissar mountain range, approximately 25–30 kilometers from the village of Kyzyltepa.

== Architecture ==
The mosque features a veranda, four mihrabs, two prayer rooms, seven doors, and nineteen columns.

On the veranda, two rows of tall carved columns are positioned. The ceiling is adorned in a traditional style, with beams and timbers intricately painted with floral motifs, supported by four columns in the small prayer room and five in the large prayer room.

The height of the mosque is 11 meters, with a total area of 32x32 meters.

The altar is adorned with inscriptions written in the Thuluth script. The decorative inscriptions contain dates from 1519–1520, 1562–1563, 1748, and 1807–1808 (dates of construction and reconstruction). Tiles are arranged along the walls in a mosaic style, some polished with inscriptions in Arabic and an unknown language. Yellow and orange tile fragments with blue, orange, and white borders are affixed to the black ground in panel lines. The surfaces of the motifs are adorned with three different patterns of stars and dark "eights", while the center is embellished with gold paint. The lower part is separated from the main floor by smooth borders of gray, gilded marble.

== Langarota Mausoleum ==
The monuments in the Langarota Mausoleum were built in the late-15th to mid-16th centuries.

The mausoleum (total area 140x12.5 meters) is single-roomed (total area 5.2x5.2 meters), with a vaulted roof resting on a four-intersecting dome. Shield-shaped arches are latticed, shelves are adorned with motifs of carved capitals, and the arches feature two-layered polychrome carving. Bricks were laid in "bandak" and "mavdj" styles on the surface of the mausoleum.

== Reconstruction ==
Judging by the inscriptions on the upper part of the column in the main hall of the mosque, it was reconstructed in 1362, according to the Higri calendar (1905 AD).

During the Soviet era, authorities conducted a series of reconstruction works on this territory.

A copy of the Katta Langar Quran, written in the Kufic script, is preserved at the mosque.
