= Mubarak Mervazi Mausoleum =

Historic site in Qashqadaryo, Uzbekistan

Muborak Mervazi Mausoleum
- Muborak Mervaziy maqbarasi (Uzbek)
- Interactive map of Muborak Mervazi Mausoleum
- 39.112103°N 65.144390°E
- Location: "Sariqqishloq" neighborhood, Mubarak district, Qashqadaryo region, Uzbekistan
- Nearest city: Muborak

Site notes
- Governing body: Department of cultural heritage of Qashqadaryo region

The Mubarak Mervazi Mausoleum is a cultural heritage object located in Uzbekistan, recognized as a significant historical site. The object was built in the 14th century and is situated in the "Sariqqishloq" neighborhood of the Muborak district in the Qashqadaryo region. According to the rights of non-residential property, it is considered state property, operated under the jurisdiction of the cultural heritage department of the Qashqadaryo region (on the basis of operational management rights). It is designated as a state-owned property in accordance with the agreement for the use of the "Vaqf" charitable community fund. By the decision of the Cabinet of Ministers of the Republic of Uzbekistan on October 4, 2019, the immovable property objects of the tangible cultural heritage were included in the national list — they are under state protection.

== Etymology ==
The Mubarak al-Mervazi Mausoleum is named after a descendant of Muhammad, Abd Allah ibn al-Mubarak.

Abd Allah ibn al-Mubarak's full name is Abu Abdurahman Abdullah ibn al-Hanzali al-Mervazi (736-797). He was born in the ancient city of Marv in Transoxiana (present-day Mary in Turkmenistan) and died at the age of 63 in the city of Khurasan, near the Euphrates in present-day Iraq, in the year 798. He was buried in the same place. He is renowned as a knowledgeable scholar, a Sufi, and a hadith scholar. His activities were primarily centered on Marv. He traveled to many cities in the Islamic world, including Baghdad, Basra, Mecca, Medina, Balkh, Bukhara, Samarkand, and Qarshi, where he learned from nearly four thousand scholars. During his travels, he met and studied with Abu Hanifa and held a prominent place among his most distinguished disciples. He wrote works on Sufism, jurisprudence, hadith studies, history, philology, and commentary on the Quran.

Mubarak al-Mervazi's shrine was brought to Amir Timur's attention and a symbolic tomb was erected in the village of Hoja Mubarak.

== Structure ==
The entrance part of the Mubarak al-Mervazi mausoleum is constructed with two domes. On the back facade, there are inscriptions in Kufic script with blue paint and white letters. Additionally, in the center, there is Mubarak al-Mervazi's tomb, a prayer room, a small pool, and a courtyard. The complex is surrounded by a thick wall. The mausoleum does not occupy such a large area. The surroundings of the burial site remained in a dilapidated state for many years. In 2017–2018, the area around the mausoleum was extensively renovated.
