= Hazrati Bashir Mausoleum =

Hazrati Bashir mausoleum
- Hazrati Bashir maqbarasi
- Interactive map of the Hazrati Bashir mausoleum area

General information
- Type: Mausoleum
- Classification: Cultural heritage object
- Location: Bashir village, Kitob district, Qashqadaryo region, Uzbekistan
- Coordinates: 39.270991°N 67.101079°E
- Named for: Hazrat Sultan Said Ahmad Bashir
- Year built: 18th century
- Owner: State property

Technical details
- Material: Wood
- Floor count: 2

Design and construction
- Designations: Included in the national register of immovable property objects of material cultural heritage on October 4, 20191
- Known for: The burial place of Hazrat Sultan Said Ahmad Bashir, a famous Sufi saint and scholar

The Hazrati Bashir Mausoleum (Uzbek: Hazrati Bashir maqbarasi) is a cultural heritage object located in Uzbekistan. The object was built in the 18th century. Hazrati Bashir mausoleum is located in the Bashir village of Kitob district, Qashqadaryo region. According to the rights of immovable property, it is considered state property on the basis of the operational management right of the Qashqadaryo region cultural heritage administration.

It is entrusted to the “Vaqf” charity community fund on the basis of a free use agreement. By the decree of the Cabinet of Ministers of the Republic of Uzbekistan, it was included in the national register of intangible property objects of material cultural heritage on October 4, 2019 — taken under state protection.

== Naming ==
The mausoleum is named after a person whose original name was Sayyid Ahmad. This person was popular among the people by the names of Bashir or Beshir ota. Bashir (or beshir) means a person who has not drunk milk.

Hazrat Sultan Said Ahmad Bashir (1368—1464) according to legends, his father Khwaja Hasan was 90 years old, his mother Bibi Malokhat was 80 years old when he was born. After this son, they have two more children and Said Ahmad does not drink his mother's milk. His birth is also associated with the prayer of Said Nematullah, the uncle of Amir Temur’s teacher Mir Said Baraka. Said Ahmad Bashir became famous by the nickname “Mir of Truth”. He became interested in the Khwaja Ahmad Yassaviy tariqa at a time when the Naqshbandiyya teachings were widely spread in Central Asia.

Many Muslims from different countries came to Hazrat Bashir ota's presence and became his disciples. He died around 1464 and was buried in Niyoztepa in Bashir village.

His grave is located on a hill covered with archa trees, in a place where he built a house for himself.

== Architecture ==
A memorial carved by masters in the form of a chest is installed on the tombstone of Hazrati Bashir ota in the mausoleum. Two sons and one servant of Bashir ota are also buried in the mausoleum. There is also a tombstone in the mausoleum, which is considered to belong to the original Mongol emperor Mirzo Sayyid Ahmad Jamoliddin.

The mausoleum is built of simple, colorless, plain wood. The mausoleum consists of two floors. Near the mausoleum there is also a room where Hazrati Bashir ota lived.

The mausoleum was moved to the left side of the grave due to the construction of the Hazrati Bashir ota mosque and brought to its current place.

In 1943, the mausoleum and mosque area was abandoned. The bricks of the madrasah located in the pilgrimage area were taken away.
