= Beshbuloq, Qashqadaryo Region =

Beshbuloq
- urban-type settlement
- Location in Uzbekistan
- Coordinates: 38°30′48″N 66°40′06″E
- Country: Uzbekistan
- Region: Qashqadaryo Region
- District: Dehqonobod District
- Urban-type settlement status: 2009

Population (2016)
  - Total: 2,445
- Time zone: UTC+5 (UZT)

Beshbuloq is an urban-type settlement in Dehqonobod District of Qashqadaryo Region in Uzbekistan. It was granted urban-type settlement status in 2009. Its population was 2,445 people in 2016.
