= Kokdala District =

Kokdala
- District
- Kokdala district
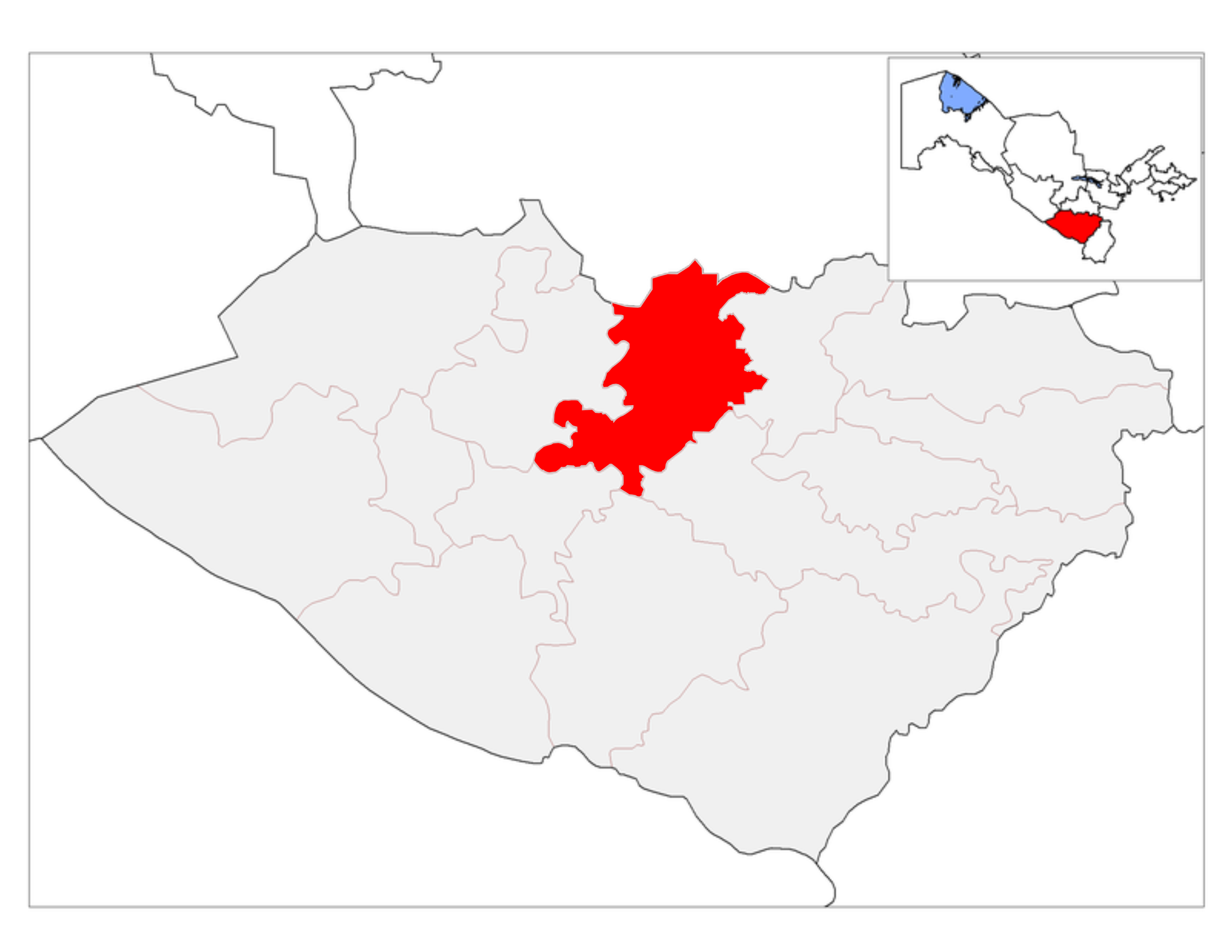
- Country: Uzbekistan
- Region: Qashqadaryo Region
- Capital: Yettitom
- Established: 2022, 17 March

Area
  - Total: 2,840 km^{2} (1,100 sq mi)

Population (2021)
  - Total: 182,000
  - Density: 64.1/km^{2} (166/sq mi)
- Time zone: UTC+5 (UZT)

Kokdala district is a district in Kashkadarya region. It was established on March 17, 2022, by dividing the territory of Chiroqchi district into two. Its center is Yettitom. The area is 171 thousand hectares.

== History ==
On October 11, 2021, Shavkat Mirziyoyev, who presented his candidacy in the 2021 presidential election, during a meeting with voters from Kashkadarya, said that due to the large population of Chiroqchi district and the lack of development of transport infrastructure, it takes a lot of time and money for the population to come and go to the center of the district, and proposed to divide the territory of the district into two. On March 2, 2022, at the plenary session of the Legislative Chamber of the Oliy Majlis of the Republic of Uzbekistan, the issue of establishing the Kokdala district was considered. At the meeting, it was agreed that 171,000 hectares of land with 177,000 inhabitants will be allocated to the newly established Kokdala district from Chiroqchi district. On March 17, 2022, at the meeting of the Senate of the Oliy Majlis of the Republic of Uzbekistan, the relevant decision on the establishment of Ko'kdala district was adopted.

Excerpt from the speech delivered by the president of Uzbekistan Shavkat Mirziyoyev at the establishment of Kokdala district:

The main goal of establishing the Kokdala district is to create decent living conditions for the 182,000 residents living here, to promote the economic development of the region, and to raise our work to a new level to ensure employment of the population.

== Neighborhoods ==
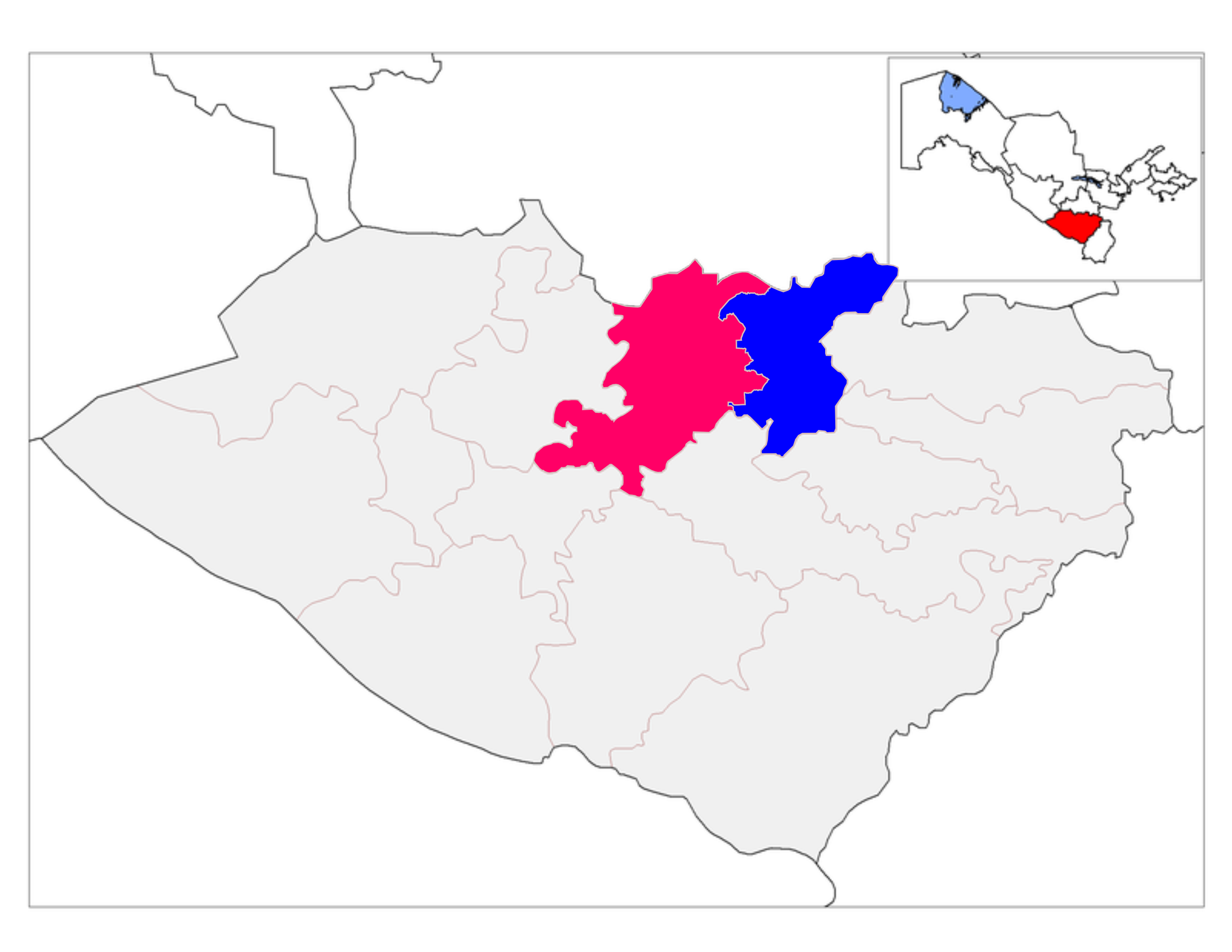
Division of the territory of Chiroqchi district into Chiroqchi (in blue) and Kokdala (in red) districts

When Kokdala District was established, the following 32 neighborhoods of Chiroqchi district were added to this district:

1. Annaruz
2. Ayritom
3. Baxt
4. Beglamish
5. Eski anhor
6. Guliston
7. Koʻkdala
8. Naymansaroy
9. Oltin boshoq
10. Oltin dala
11. Paxtalisoy
12. Qanotli
13. Qumdaryo
14. Soyboʻyi
15. Suvliq
16. Taloqtepa
17. Torjilgʻa
18. Toshli
19. Toʻqmor
20. Umakay
21. Uymovut
22. Xarduri
23. Xushali
24. Xoʻjaobod
25. Zum
26. Oʻtamayli
27. Gʻallakor
28. Shoʻrbozor
29. Shoʻrquduq
30. Chiyal
31. Chorvador
32. Chuvulloq
