= Kasbi town =

Uzbekistani town

Kasbi
- Town
- Location in Uzbekistan
- Coordinates: 38°57′0″N 65°24′0″E
- Country: Uzbekistan
- Region: Qashqadaryo Region
- District: Kasbi
- Urban-type settlement status: 2009
- Time zone: UTC+5 (UZT)

Kasbi is a town belonging to the Kasbi District of Qashqadaryo Region in the Republic of Uzbekistan. The town's status was given in 2009.
