= Eski Yakkabogʻ =

- urban-type settlement
- Location in Uzbekistan
- Coordinates: 38°55′53″N 66°50′20″E
- Country: Uzbekistan
- Region: Qashqadaryo Region
- District: Yakkabogʻ District
- Urban-type settlement: 1989

Population (2004)
  - Total: 10,800
- Time zone: UTC+5 (UZT)

Eski Yakkabogʻ (Uzbek: Eski Yakkabogʻ, Эски Яккабоғ) is an urban-type settlement in Qashqadaryo Region, Uzbekistan. It is part of Yakkabogʻ District. The town population in 2004 was 10,800 people.
