= Dehqonobod District =

Coordinates: 38°20′59″N 66°29′46″E

- District
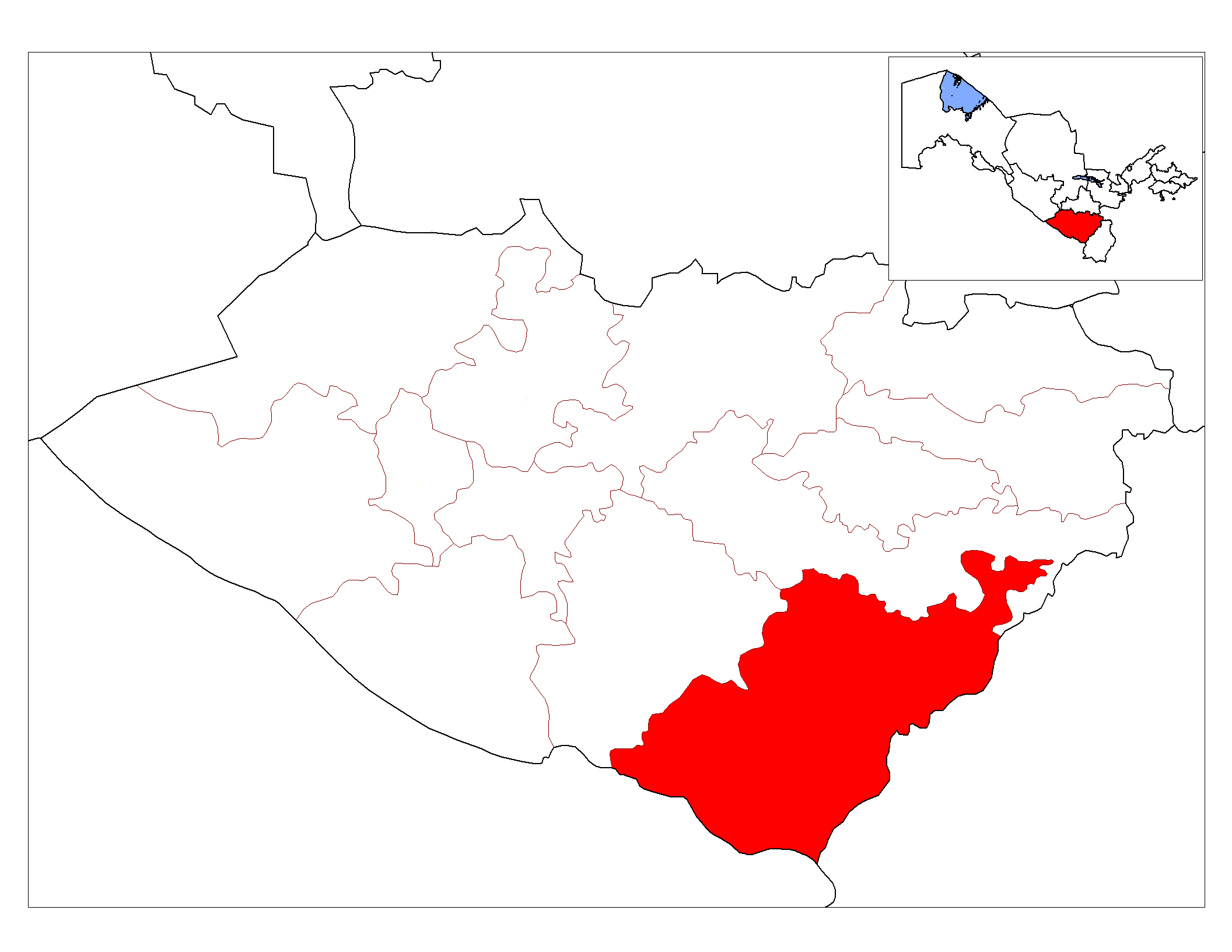
- Country: Uzbekistan
- Region: Qashqadaryo Region
- Capital: Karashina

Area
  - Total: 4,000 km^{2} (1,500 sq mi)

Population (2021)
  - Total: 149,800
  - Density: 37/km^{2} (97/sq mi)
- Time zone: UTC+5 (UZT)

Dehqonobod District (Uzbek: Dehqonobod tumani / Деҳқонобод тумани, Russian: Дехканабадский район, romanized: Dekhkanabadsky rayon) is a district of Qashqadaryo Region in Uzbekistan. The capital lies at Karashina. It has an area of 2,660 km^{2} (1,030 sq mi) and its population is 149,800 (2021 est.). The district consists of 3 urban-type settlements (Karashina, Dehqonobod, Beshbuloq) and 14 rural communities.

== History ==
Dehqonobod district was established on September 29, 1926. In 1962, Dehqonobod was merged into Gʻuzor district, another district in Qashqadaryo Region, and in 1971 it was separated from Gʻuzor. Dehqonobod District is located in the south-east of Qashqadaryo Region.

== Direction ==
It is bordered by Gʻuzor District to the north-west, Qamashi District to the north-east, Surxondaryo Region to the south-east, and Turkmenistan to the west.
