= Mausoleum of Hazrat Sultan =

Ancient burial site in Qashkadaryo, Uzbekistan

- Hazrati Sulton maqbarasi (Uzbek)
- Interactive map of Mausoleum of Hazrat Sultan
- 39.83895°N 67.38781°E
- Location: Shut village, Kohsor neighborhood, Kitob district, Qashkadaryo region, Uzbekistan
- Nearest city: Qarshi

History
- Built: 12th-13th centuries
- Built for: Mausoleum

Site notes
- Restored: 16th-18th centuries

Mausoleum of Hazrat Sultan is a memorial site located in the Shut village of the Koʻhsor neighborhood in the Kitob district of Qashqadaryo region, dating back to the 12th to 13th centuries. According to the rights of non-residential property, it is considered state property, operated under the jurisdiction of the cultural heritage department of the Qashqadaryo region (on the basis of operational management rights). It is designated as a state-owned property in accordance with the agreement for the use of the "Vaqf" charitable community fund.

By the decision of the Cabinet of Ministers of the Republic of Uzbekistan on February 24, 2021, regarding additional measures to develop internal and pilgrimage tourism, the immovable property objects of the tangible cultural heritage were included in the national list — they are under state protection.

== Structure ==
The ancient part of the Mausoleum of Hazrati Sulton consists of a long corridor and leads to the domed pilgrimage site through a wide paved path. There are three domes covering the pilgrimage site. The mausoleum was reconstructed in the 16th to 18th centuries. It underwent further renovations in 1895.

== Location ==
The Mausoleum of Hazrati Sulton is located at the highest point of Uzbekistan, known as Khazret Sultan. This peak is situated in the Hisor Range, and its elevation is 4,643 meters.

The pilgrimage site of Hazrati Sulton is located 82 kilometers northeast of Shahrisabz in the Kitob district. It is positioned at the separation point of the Zarafshan and Hisor Ranges, which are adjacent to the territory of the Republic of Tajikistan.

The Mausoleum of Hazrati Sulton is considered the highest pilgrimage site above sea level within the borders of Uzbekistan. It is situated at an elevation of 4,067 meters above sea level. Due to its high altitude, visiting the pilgrimage site presents some challenges, and as a result, not many people have had the opportunity to make the pilgrimage so far.

== Naming ==
The Mausoleum of Hazrati Sulton and the mountain pass are also famous among the people as the "Kohi Tavba" and "Avgoyi Qiyomat." Additionally, there are several folk legends about the mountain pass, and due to its association with divine power, ascending to this place and capturing its image is believed to be quite challenging and miraculous.
