= Nuriston =

- urban-type settlement
- Location in Uzbekistan
- Coordinates: 38°29′21″N 65°38′47″E
- Country: Uzbekistan
- Region: Qashqadaryo Region
- District: Nishon District
- Urban-type settlement: 1992

Population (2003)
  - Total: 10,500
- Time zone: UTC+5 (UZT)

Nuriston (Uzbek: Нуристон, Nuriston, Russian: Нуристaн) is an urban-type settlement in Qashqadaryo Region, Uzbekistan. It is part of Nishon District. The town population in 2003 was 10,500 people.
