= Shurbazar =

Shurbazar Sho‘rbozor
- Low density rural
- Location in Uzbekistan
- Coordinates: 39°17′0″N 66°08′0″E
- Country: Uzbekistan
- Region: Qashqadaryo Region
- Elevation: 427 m (1,401 ft)

Population
  - Total: 28,394,180
  - Density: 315/km^{2} (820/sq mi)
- Time zone: UTC+5 (Asia/Samarkand)
- Area code: +998

Shurbazar is a market town in eastern Uzbekistan, Central Asia. It is in southern Qashqadaryo Region. Specifically within the southern part of Qashqadaryo Region.Situated in the basin of Shurbazar is located in the basin of the Qashqadaryo River.

The nearest large town Chiroqchi, 48 KM to southeast. The national capital Tashkent is about 340 km to the northeast. The nearest airport is Karshi-Khanabad Air Base, 55 km away.
