= Koson, Uzbekistan =

Koson
- City
- Location in Uzbekistan
- Coordinates: 39°02′11″N 65°34′23″E
- Country: Uzbekistan
- Region: Qashqadaryo Region
- District: Koson District
- Town status: 1972

Population (2016)
  - Total: 68,900
- Time zone: UTC+5 (UZT)

Koson (Uzbek: Косон) is a city and the administrative center of Koson District in the Kashkadarya Region of Uzbekistan. It is located in a historical region known as Sogdiana, which was part of the ancient Silk Road trade route. The city had a population of 59,300 residents as of 2005. Koson was granted city status in 1972, prior to that, it was a village (kishlak). The city is home to a railway station of the same name on the Karshi-Bukhara railway line.

== History ==
The permanent population began residing in Koson after the decline of the ancient city of Yerkurgan in Sogdiana. The city features a castle dating back to the 4th and 5th centuries, surrounded by defensive walls. Prior to the Mongol invasion, these defensive walls were repaired three times. Most of the remaining historical structures, according to archaeologists, date from the 15th to the 16th centuries. The city thrived due to the caravans of traders passing through the region.In 1640, there was a rebellion led by Bobo Mirak.

The governor of Samarkand, Khodjamkulibi, relied on the Chinese-Kipchak tribe to capture Koson and plunder the Nasaf region, which allowed Anushahan to invade the Bukhara Khanate. The name of the Sogdiana province, known as "Xenippa" in ancient sources, may be an altered form of the term Koson. The city is mentioned on copper coins from the 4th to the 6th centuries AD, bearing the inscription "Great King of Koson ". Koson was granted city status in 1972.

== Location ==
The city is located 30 kilometers from the administrative center of the Karshi Region, the city of Karshi. It is also close to a highway that connects Tashkent and Dushanbe.

== Industry ==
During Soviet times, in Koson, two cotton factories, a porcelain factory, a brick factory, a brewery, and an oil mill were established.

== Population ==
- 1979- 28k
- 1989-40k
- 2005-59k
- 2017-71k
