= Qorashina =

- urban-type settlement
- Location in Uzbekistan
- Coordinates: 38°20′22″N 66°33′43″E
- Country: Uzbekistan
- Region: Qashqadaryo Region
- District: Dehqonobod District

Population (2016)
  - Total: 11,900
- Time zone: UTC+5 (UZT)

Qorashina (Uzbek: Qorashina / Қорашина / قاره شینه, Russian: Карашина) is an urban-type settlement in Dehqonobod District of Qashqadaryo Region in Uzbekistan. It is the capital of Dehqonobod District. Its population was 5,285 people in 1989, and 11,900 in 2016.
