= Tallimarjon =

- Location in Uzbekistan
- Coordinates: 38°17′48″N 65°33′12″E
- Country: Uzbekistan
- Region: Qashqadaryo Region
- District: Nishon District
- Township: 1975

Population (2016)
  - Total: 10,800
- Time zone: UTC+5 (UZT)

Tallimarjon (Uzbek: Tallimarjon / Таллимаржон or Talimarjon) is a town in Qashqadaryo Region, Uzbekistan. It is part of Nishon District. The town population was 6715 people in 1989, and 10,800 in 2016.
