= Yakkabogʻ District =

Coordinates: 38°55′57″N 66°45′38″E

- District
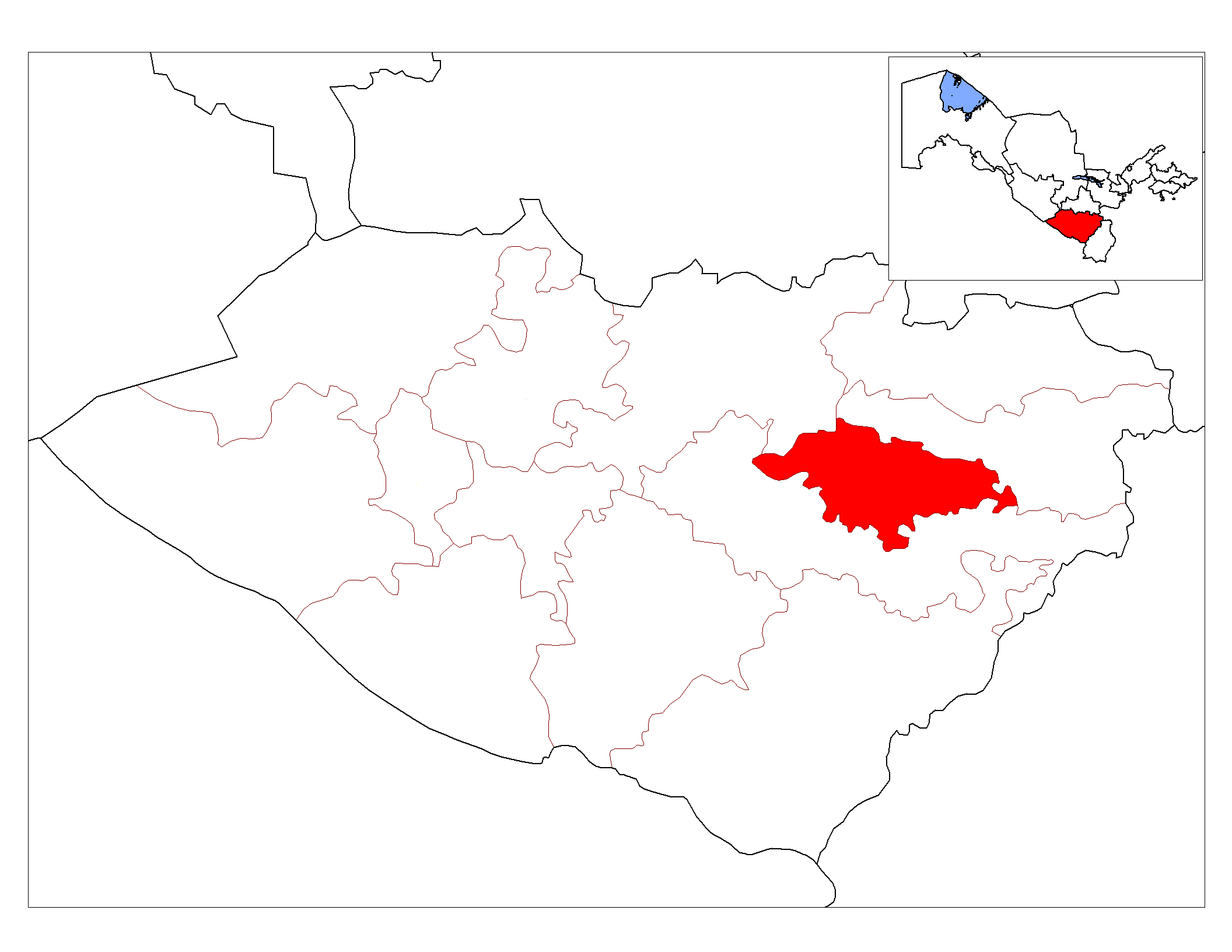
- Country: Uzbekistan
- Region: Qashqadaryo Region
- Capital: Yakkabogʻ

Area
  - Total: 1,100 km^{2} (420 sq mi)

Population (2021)
  - Total: 266,100
  - Density: 240/km^{2} (630/sq mi)
- Time zone: UTC+5 (UZT)

Yakkabogʻ District is a district of Qashqadaryo Region in Uzbekistan. The capital lies at the city Yakkabogʻ. It has an area of 1,100 km^{2} (420 sq mi) and its population is 266,100 (2021 est.). The district consists of one city (Yakkabogʻ), 14 urban-type settlements (Eski Yakkabogʻ, Alaqargʻa, Alakoʻylak, Jarqirgʻiz, Qayragʻoch, Qatagʻon, Kattabogʻ, Madaniyat, Mevazor, Samoq, Turon, Oʻz, Chubron, Edilbek) and 9 rural communities.
