= Yangi Mirishkor =

Urban-type settlement in Qashqadaryo Region, Uzbekistan

- urban-type settlement
- Location in Uzbekistan
- Coordinates: 38°51′5″N 65°16′40″E
- Country: Uzbekistan
- Region: Qashqadaryo Region
- District: Mirishkor District
- Urban-type settlement: 2009

Population (2016)
  - Total: 17,000
- Time zone: UTC+5 (UZT)

Yangi Mirishkor (Uzbek: Yangi Mirishkor/Янги Миришкор, Russian: Янги Миришкор) is an urban-type settlement in Qashqadaryo Region, Uzbekistan. It is the administrative center of Mirishkor District. Its population was 3,107 people in 1989, and 17,000 in 2016.
