= Beshkent, Uzbekistan =

Beshkent
- City
- Location in Uzbekistan
- Coordinates: 38°49′00″N 65°39′00″E
- Country: Uzbekistan
- Region: Qashqadaryo Region
- District: Qarshi District

Population (2016)
  - Total: 18,900
- Time zone: UTC+5 (UZT)

Beshkent (Uzbek: Beshkent/Бешкент, Russian: Бешкент) is a city in Qarshi District of Qashqadaryo Region in Uzbekistan. It is the capital of Qarshi District. The town population was 11551 people in 1989, and 18,900 in 2016.
