= Chiroqchi =

- City
- Location in Uzbekistan
- Coordinates: 39°2′1″N 66°34′26″E
- Country: Uzbekistan
- Region: Qashqadaryo Region
- District: Chiroqchi District

Population (2016)
  - Total: 23,800
- Time zone: UTC+5 (UZT)

Chiroqchi (Uzbek: Chiroqchi, Russian: Чиракчи, romanized: Chirakchi) is a city in Qashqadaryo Region, Uzbekistan. It is the capital of Chiroqchi District. Its population is 23,800 (2016).

== History ==
The name of the settlement is Chirakchi Fortress, known since the 14th century. It was the center of the Chirakchin district of the Bukhara Khanate. Around the modern city of Chirakchi, on the territory of the Mehnatkash collective farm, there are remains of the ancient city of Kishmishtepa. This city was founded around the 5th to 6th centuries AD. It consisted of a citadel, Shahristan. The Shahristan covers an area of 24 hectares and is surrounded by walls and a moat. The walls date back to the 7th to 8th centuries and were strengthened in the 9th to 10th centuries. The Shahristan began to expand in the 7th to 8th centuries and became a major city in the 9th to 10th centuries. After the Mongol invasion in the 13th century, the city fell into decline.

S. B. Lunin provides a description of this city, stating that "On the outskirts of the Chirakchin district center, not far from the bank of the Kashkadarya River, are the ruins of Kishmishtepa, which can be considered the remains of a medieval city. Research was conducted in this area in the 1960s. The dimensions of the Shahristan were estimated to be 700 by 350 meters. After the construction of brick and other factories, the ancient city was destroyed. Scholar Shamsuddin Kamoliddinov believes that the city of Khushminjakas, mentioned in the Kitab-al-Ansab by Abdul Karim ibn Muhammad al-Samani, who traveled through Central Asia in the 12th century, Kishmishtepa. The ancient city was discovered when children found silver and gold coins. To this day, people continue to find objects of daily life here. The most famous of these finds is a silver coin with the image of Mamun al-Rashid, the brother of Caliph Harun al-Rashid, a character from the world-renowned book "One Thousand and One Nights". Sources from the mid-18th century indicate the existence of the Chirakchi Fortress. According to academician V. V. Bartold, Chirakchi existed even earlier, during the reign of Ubaydullah Khan.

Major cities around Chirakchi, Karshi, and Shakhrisabz, were directly subordinate to the Emir of Bukhara. The caravan route through Shakhrisabz was mountainous and difficult to traverse, so the road through Chirakchi was the most convenient. Even caravans from Afghanistan and India passed through here. In the 19th century, Chirakchi was a small fortress surrounded by defensive walls. The famous Hungarian traveler and historian Hermann Vambéry mentioned this in his "Journey to Central Asia". In his memoirs, Sadriddin Ayni recounts an attempt to foment uprisings in Chirakchi during the rule of Abdullah Khan. It is said that the residents, tired of the indifference of local officials, decided to revolt. However, later they changed their minds and decided to send a delegation of 200 people to the Emir of Bukhara:

"These people traditionally wear black felt clothing, similar to Mexican ponchos. In Bukhara, there were rumors about two hundred people in 'black felt.' Initially, the Emir of Bukhara treated them well, but later, through deception, decided to arrest them". After World War II, some German and Polish prisoners of war found temporary refuge here, and some lived here until the end of their lives. On November 24, 1977, by a decision of the Presidium of the Supreme Soviet of Uzbekistan, Chirakchi was designated as the center of the district. It officially received the status of a city in 1980.

== Socio-economic status ==
A cotton ginning plant and a repair and maintenance station are operating in the city. There is also a carpet factory. Residents of the city earn their income mainly from small trade, homesteading, and livestock farming. In 2005, "Ulug" limited liability company, in cooperation with "Kitsan Sanayi" enterprise of Turkey, opened a joint enterprise that processes cotton fiber and produces kalava and knitted products from it. With a charter capital of US$600,000, the venture created about 100 new jobs.

== Geography ==
It is located on the Kashkadarya River, 12 kilometers from the Yakkabag railway station, and about 500 kilometers to the south of Tashkent. The city is situated in the southwestern foothills of the Zeravshan Range at an elevation of approximately 510 meters above sea level.

== Attractions ==
There is a cotton gin plant and a carpet and art factory. The local football club "Chirokchi" is popular among the townspeople, which plays at the new stadium "Tamerlan", designed for 3,000 spectators.
