= Kitab State Geological Reserve =

Geological reserve in Uzbekistan

Coordinates: 39°10′30″N 67°18′43″E

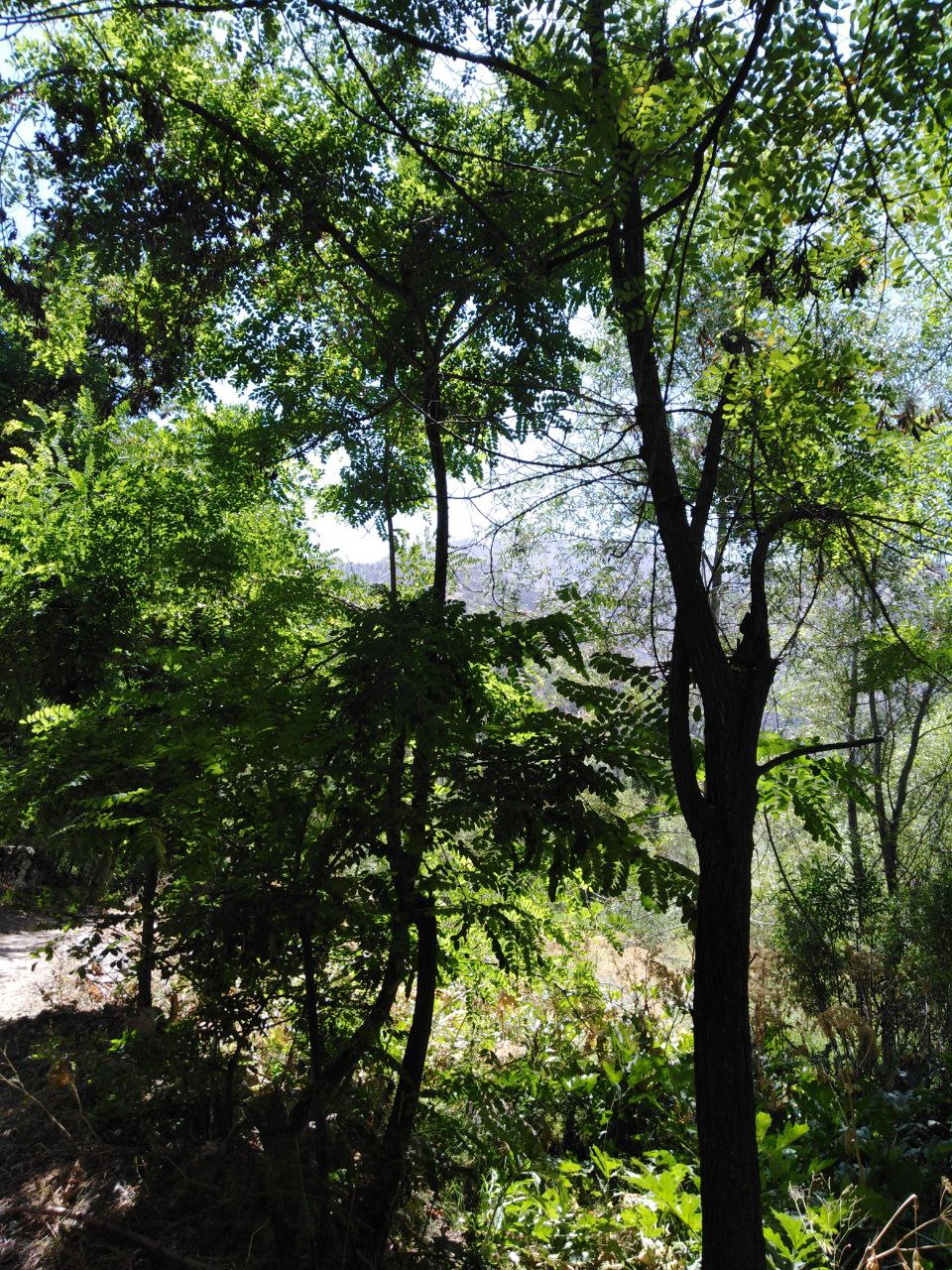
- Plants in Kitab State Geological Reserve
- Interactive map of Kitab State Geological Reserve
- Location: Qashqadaryo Region Uzbekistan
- Nearest city: Kitob District
- Area: 53.78km^2
- Created: 1979
- Website: https://www.osce.org/ru/uzbekistan/71083?download=true

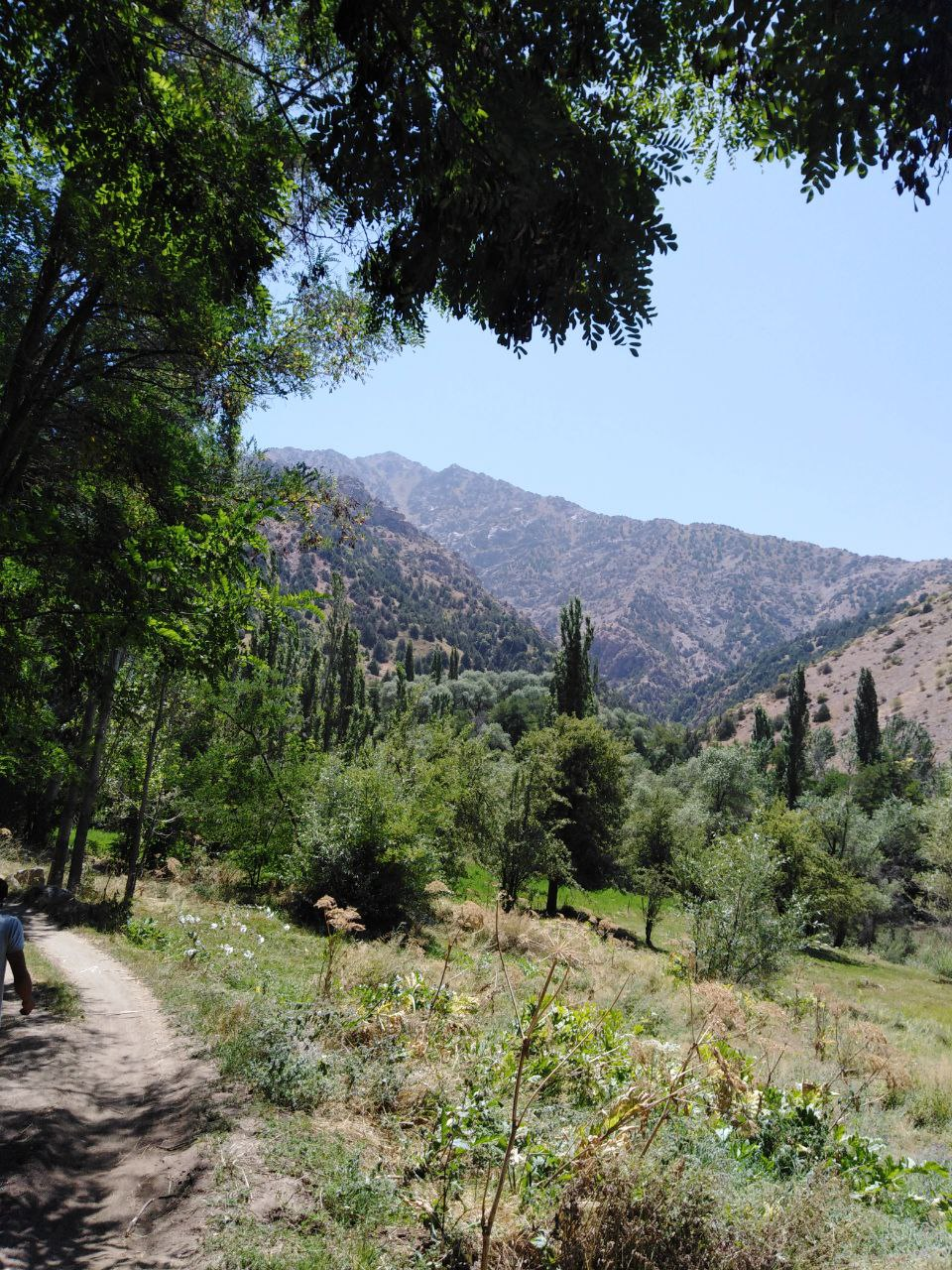
Nature of Kitab state geological reserve

Kitab State Geological Reserve is located in the Kitab district of Kashkadarya region, Uzbekistan. It is located on the south-western branches of the Zarafshan mountain range, on the left bank of the Jinni Darya and on the northern side of Karatog, 45 km east of the city of Kitab. The area is 5378 ha. It was established in 1979 in order to study and protect unique paleontological-stratigraphic objects, which are natural-scientific monuments related to the geological history of the Earth. In the Kitab State Geological Reserve, marine sediment formations from the Middle Ordovician period to the boundary layers of the Devonian and Carboniferous periods are observed in a stable consistency in several stream valleys that cross the direction of the rocks of the Paleozoic layer. They are characterized by various paleontological phyla representing fauna and flora belonging to 16 different groups.

The absolute height of the reserve is 1300–2650 m, the relative height is from 500 m to 1500 m. The terrain is rocky, sharply divided in the highlands, and somewhat flat in the middle altitudes. As a result of the deep cutting of the mountain ridges of Obisafed, Khojakurgan, Zinzilbon, and Novabak streams, scenic mountain ravines were created. One of the international stratigraphic benchmarks of the Devonian system, the stratotype of the lower boundary of the Ems stage, chosen by the International Subcommission on Devonian Stratigraphy in 1989 and ratified by the International Association of Geological Sciences in 1996, is located in the Zinzilbon section of the Reserve. Its cuttings became the basis for granting international status to the reserve. In the territory of the reserve, from the Middle Ordovician to the Lower Carbonifer-us period, the sections made up of marine -edimentary formations are mainly composed of carbonate and less terrigenous and volcanogenic rocks with a total thickness of more than 4000 m. Most of them consist of various paleontological fossils in the form of microscopic and macroscopic remains, which are important for determining the age and correlation of deposits, for understanding the conditions of formation of one or another deposit, and for the reasonable interpretation of the geological structure of the studied regions. Since the establishment of the reserve, international conventions, colloquiums, excursions, various paleontological and stratigraphic researches on various groups of the animal world have been held at its base.
