= Qarshi District =

Coordinates: 38°51′55″N 65°42′48″E

- District
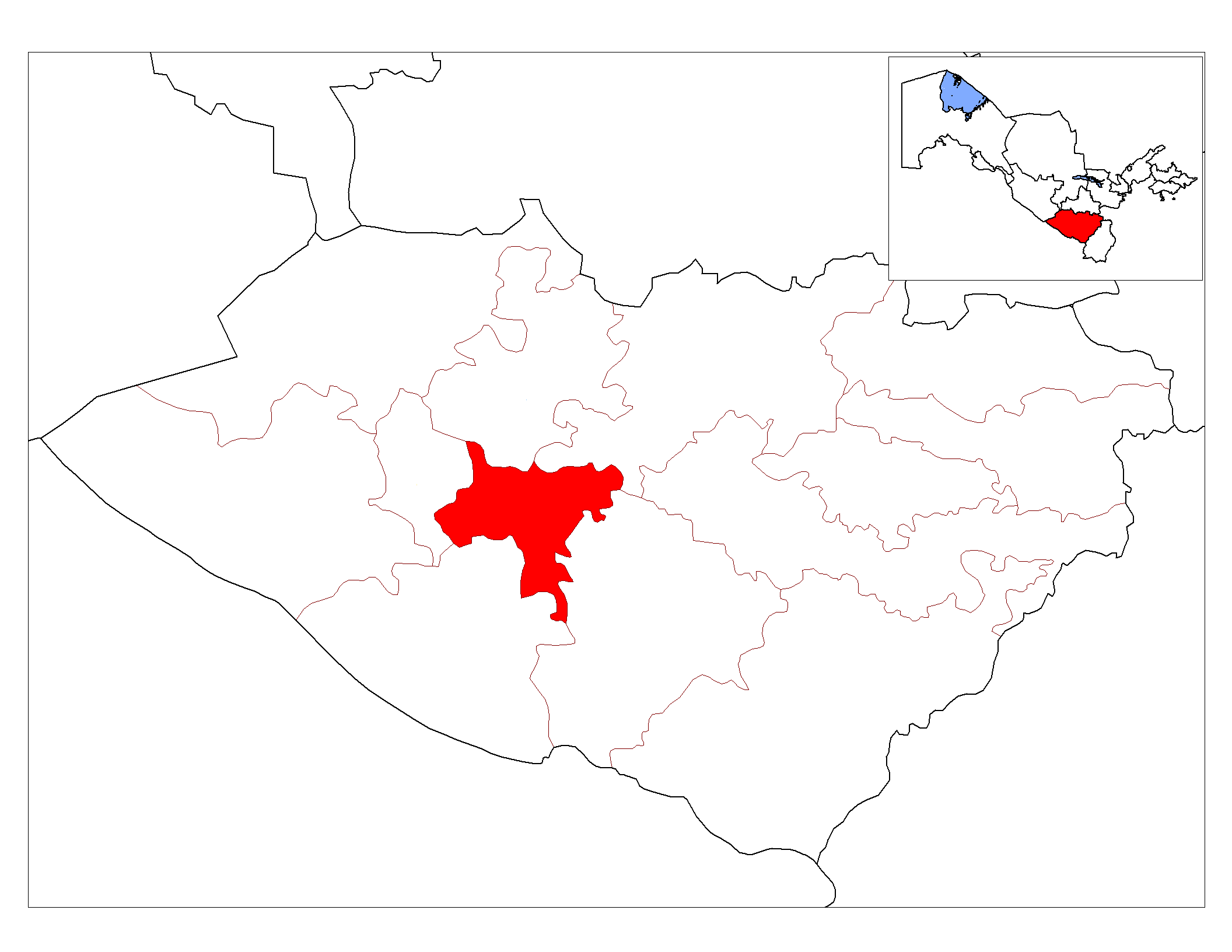
- Country: Uzbekistan
- Region: Qashqadaryo Region
- Capital: Qarshi

Area
  - Total: 910 km^{2} (350 sq mi)

Population (2021)
  - Total: 252,600
  - Density: 280/km^{2} (720/sq mi)
- Time zone: UTC+5 (UZT)

Qarshi District is a district of Qashqadaryo Region in Uzbekistan. The capital lies at the city Qarshi. It has an area of 910 km^{2} (350 sq mi) and its population is 252,600 (2021 est.). The district consists of one city (Beshkent), 15 urban-type settlements (Fayzobod, Saroy, Gʻubdin, Lagʻmon, Kuchkak, Xonobod, Shilvi, Qovchin, Nuqrabod, Yertepa, Navroʻz, Jumabozor, Mustaqillik, Mirmiron Yangi xayot) and 15 rural communities.
