= Mugʻlon =

- urban-type settlement
- Location in Uzbekistan
- Coordinates: 38°55′03″N 65°25′00″E
- Country: Uzbekistan
- Region: Qashqadaryo Region
- District: Kasbi District

Population (2016)
  - Total: 6,600
- Time zone: UTC+5 (UZT)

Mugʻlon (Uzbek: Mugʻlon/Муғлон, Russian: Муглан, romanized: Muglan) is an urban-type settlement in Kasbi District of Qashqadaryo Region in Uzbekistan. It is the capital of Kasbi District. Its population is 6,600 (2016).
