= Yakkabogʻ =

- City
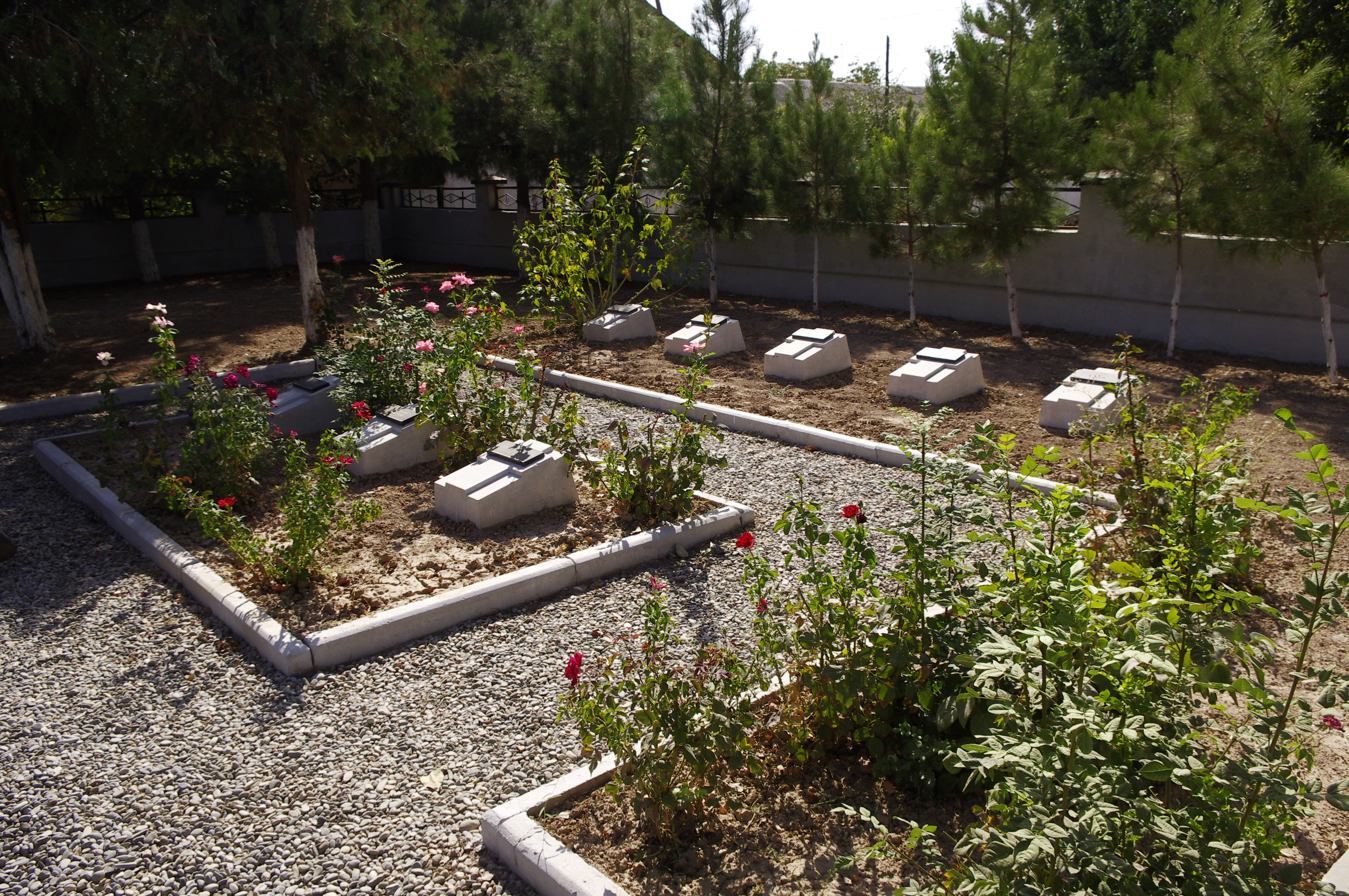
- Polish cemetery from World War II

- Location in Uzbekistan
- Coordinates: 38°58′48″N 66°40′48″E
- Country: Uzbekistan
- Region: Qashqadaryo Region
- District: Yakkabogʻ District
- Town status: 1978

Population (2016)
  - Total: 20,600
- Time zone: UTC+5 (UZT)

Yakkabogʻ (Uzbek: Yakkabog’/Яккабоғ, Russian: Яккабаг, romanized: Yakkabag) is a city in Yakkabogʻ District of Qashqadaryo Region in Uzbekistan. It is the administrative center of Yakkabogʻ District. The town population was 17,402 people in 1989, and 20,600 in 2016.

== History ==
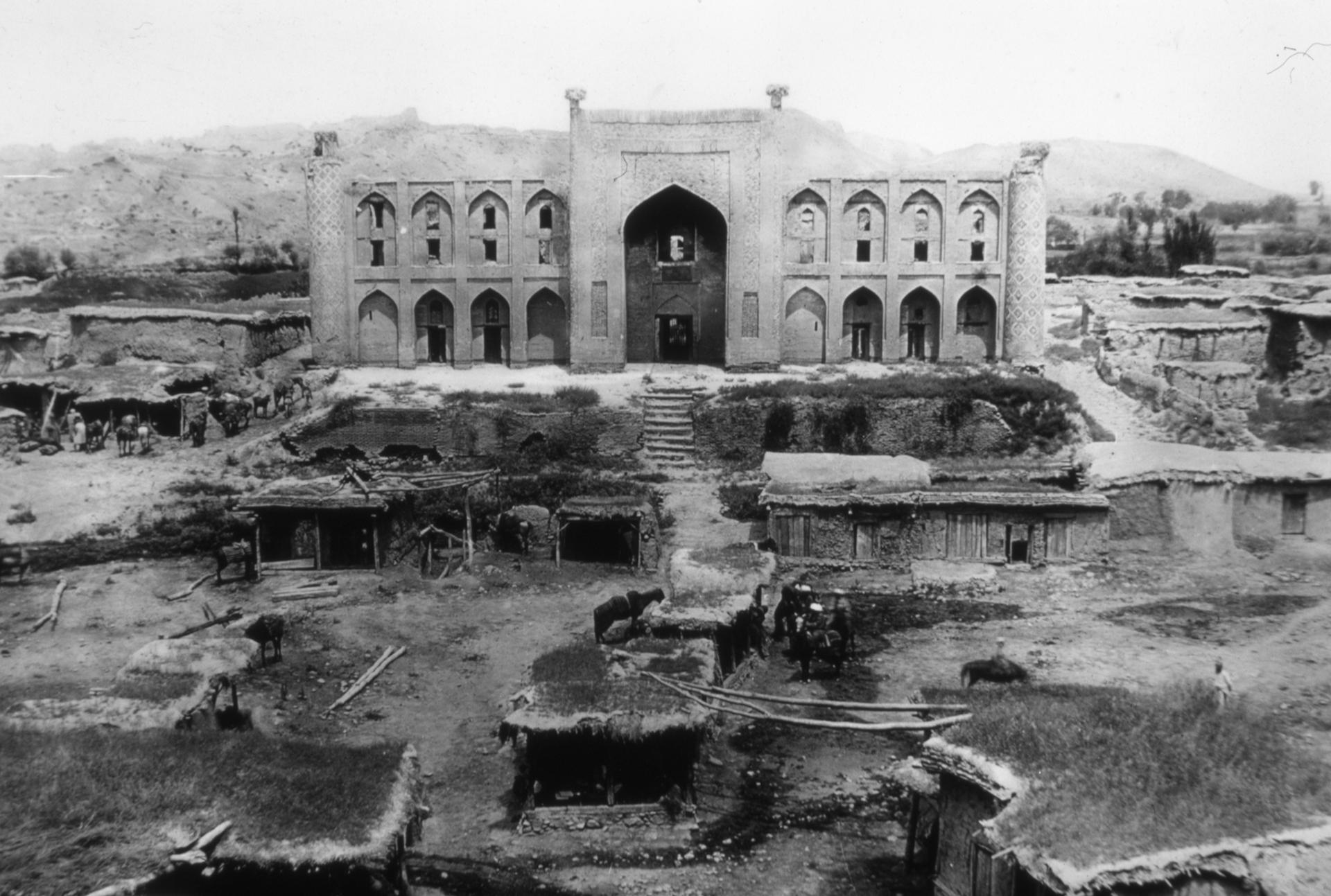
Old picture of a local madrasa

There is a Polish cemetery from World War II in the city. In 1954, the settlement near the Yakkabag railway station was granted the status of an urban-type settlement (посёлок городского типа) and officially named "Stanitsa Yakkabag." In 1978, it was transformed into the city of Yakkabag. The name "Yakkabag" in Uzbek translates to "Lonely Garden."

== Etymology ==
The city name "Yakkabag" is derived from the combination of two words, "yakka" and "bog." The word "yakka" is used as a synonym for "lonely" and "solitary" words. The word "bog" originally comes from the old Turkish language. Initially, "bog" was used only in the sense of "naked" or "bare," but later it also began to be used in the context of areas where various fruit trees were planted. "Yakkabag" implies an area where there are no dense forests or thickets, but rather an area enclosed by walls.

== Location ==
Yakkabog is the administrative center of the Kashkadarya region (Karshi) and is located 95 km east of the nearest railway station.

== Population ==
| 1959 | 1970 | 1979 | 1989 | 2005 |
|---|---|---|---|---|
| 3581 | 7130 | 11 998 | 17 402 | 22 800 |

== Economy ==
In the Yakkabag District, there are a total of over 2,300 enterprises, organizations, and trade outlets. These businesses engage in various activities, including cotton ginning, flour milling, wine and preserve production, as well as repair workshops for agricultural machinery. There are also factories that process agricultural products, micro-enterprises, and providers of civil and household services. Some notable companies and joint ventures include "Yakkaboghtex" (Uzbekistan-Germany), "Al-Maruf" (Uzbekistan-Russia), cooperative farms, and farmer households. Agricultural activities in the district encompass cotton farming, fruit orchards, gardening, silkworm farming, and carpet weaving, among others.

== Social sphere ==
There are Schools - 101, Libraries - 21, Preschool educational institutions - 91, Healthcare institutions – 20, Mosques - 19, children's music and sports schools, 9 vocational colleges, a city culture house, club institutions, a culture and recreation park, 2 hospitals, central and dental polyclinics, maternity hospitals, pharmacies, and cotton ginning factories provide services to the population. Bus service has been launched between the city of Yakkabog and neighboring district centers and the city of Karshi.
