= Yangi Nishon =

- City
- Location in Uzbekistan
- Coordinates: 38°39′21″N 65°41′58″E
- Country: Uzbekistan
- Region: Qashqadaryo Region
- District: Nishon District
- Town status: 1982

Population (2016)
  - Total: 13,300
- Time zone: UTC+5 (UZT)

Yangi Nishon (Uzbek: Yangi Nishon, Russian: Янги Нишан) is a city in Nishon District of Qashqadaryo Region in Uzbekistan. It is the administrative center of Nishon District. Its population was 9,800 in 2003, and 13,300 in 2016.
