= Kitob =

- City
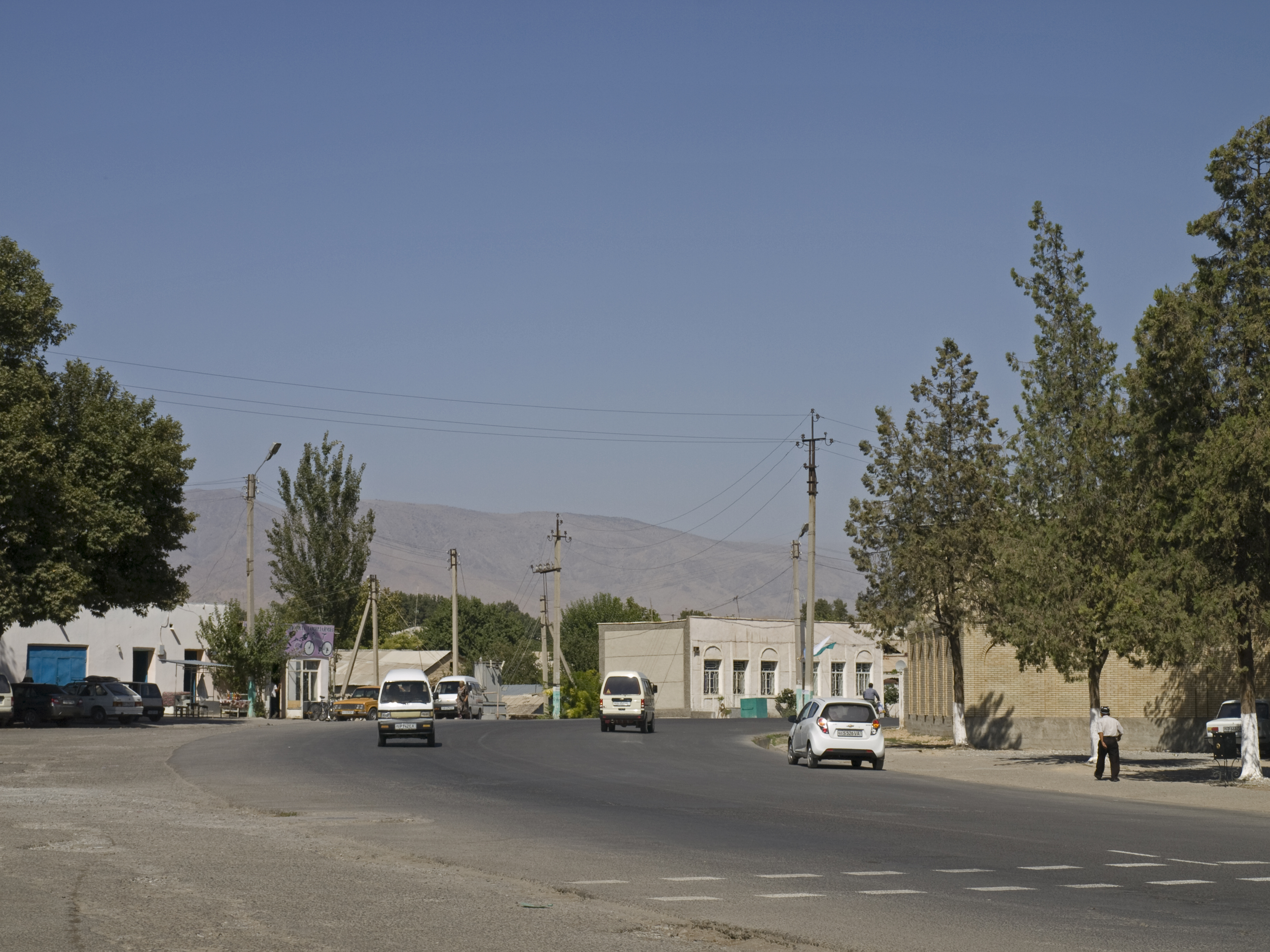
- The Zarafshan Range from the center of Kitab

- Location in Uzbekistan
- Coordinates: 39°08′01″N 66°52′55″E
- Country: Uzbekistan
- Region: Qashqadaryo Region
- District: Kitob District
- Town status: 1976

Population (2016)
  - Total: 40,800
- Time zone: UTC+5 (UZT)
- Postal code: 187000
- Website: qashqadaryo.uz/oz/view/kitob-tuman

Kitob (Uzbek: Kitob, Russian: Китаб, romanized: Kitab) is a city in Kitob District of Qashqadaryo Region in Uzbekistan. It is the administrative center of Kitob District. Its population is 40,800 (2016).

During the Soviet period, a major astronomical observatory was built at Kitab to commemorate its medieval reputation as the 'town of astronomers.'
