= Koson District =

Coordinates: 39°02′13″N 65°34′23″E

- District
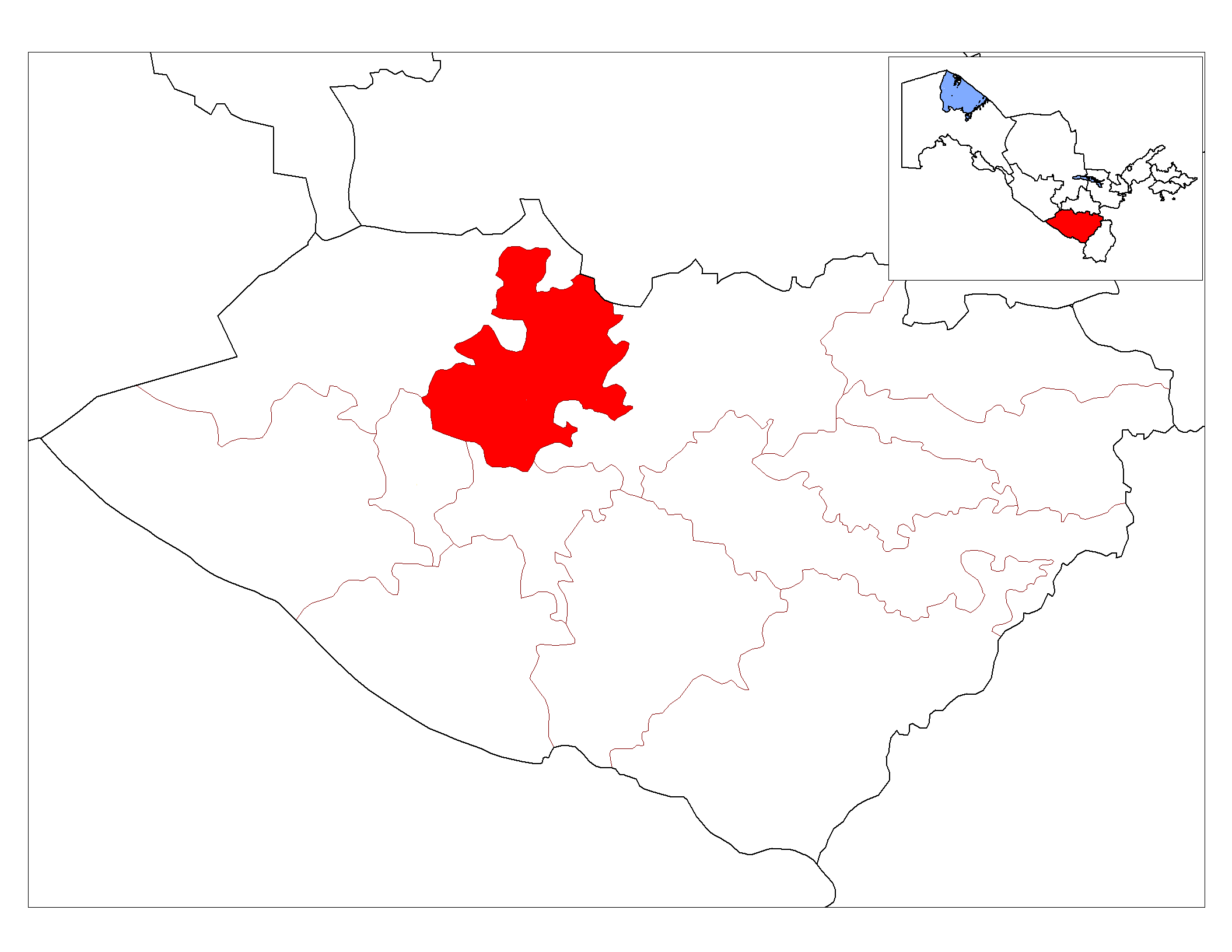
- Country: Uzbekistan
- Region: Qashqadaryo Region
- Capital: Koson

Area
  - Total: 1,880 km^{2} (730 sq mi)

Population (2021)
  - Total: 290,600
  - Density: 155/km^{2} (400/sq mi)
- Time zone: UTC+5 (UZT)

Koson District is a district of Qashqadaryo Region in Uzbekistan. The capital lies at the city Koson. It has an area of 1,880 km^{2} (730 sq mi) and its population is 290,600 (2021 est.). The district consists of one city (Koson), 14 urban-type settlements (Boygʻundi, Boyterak, Guvalak, Istiqlol, Qoʻyi Obron, Mudin, Oqtepa, Obod, Pudina, Poʻlati, Rahimsoʻfi, Surhon, Toʻlgʻa, Esaboy) and 9 rural communities.
