= Qamashi =

Qamashi Uzbek: Qamashi
- City
- Location in Uzbekistan
- Coordinates: 38°49′27″N 66°27′39″E
- Country: Uzbekistan
- Region: Qashqadaryo Region
- District: Qamashi District

Population (2016)
  - Total: 39,100
- Time zone: UTC+5 (UZT)

Qamashi (Uzbek: Qamashi) is a city in Qamashi District of Qashqadaryo Region in Uzbekistan. It is the capital of Qamashi District.

The length of the transport road from Qamashi to Karshi is 63 km. According to local information, the name Qamashi is derived from the name of the kamaychi branch of the Uzbek Kungirot clan. The population of the city is 34,000 (2005). Qamashi has a cotton gin, a building materials factory, other construction organisations, an MTP, the Qamashi car dealership company, computer clubs, a dog park, amusement parks, high-rise residences, a chain of hardware and food stores, the 'Langar Ota' shrine, the 'Mikron' company (making pasta), a leather processing enterprise, and a wool factory. In addition, small, medium, and large enterprises and micro-firms have been operating for many years. The city has two lyceums, 32 vocational colleges, five general education schools, children's music and sports schools, a central library, club institutions, and a cultural centre. The district central hospital, polyclinic, maternity hospital, pharmacies, and medical institutions serve the population. There are buses and route taxis from Qamashi to the regional centre (Karshi).

== Population ==
The town population was 22,270 people in 1989, 34,000 in 2005, and 39,100 in 2016.
