= Nishon District =

Coordinates: 38°33′27″N 65°34′15″E

- District
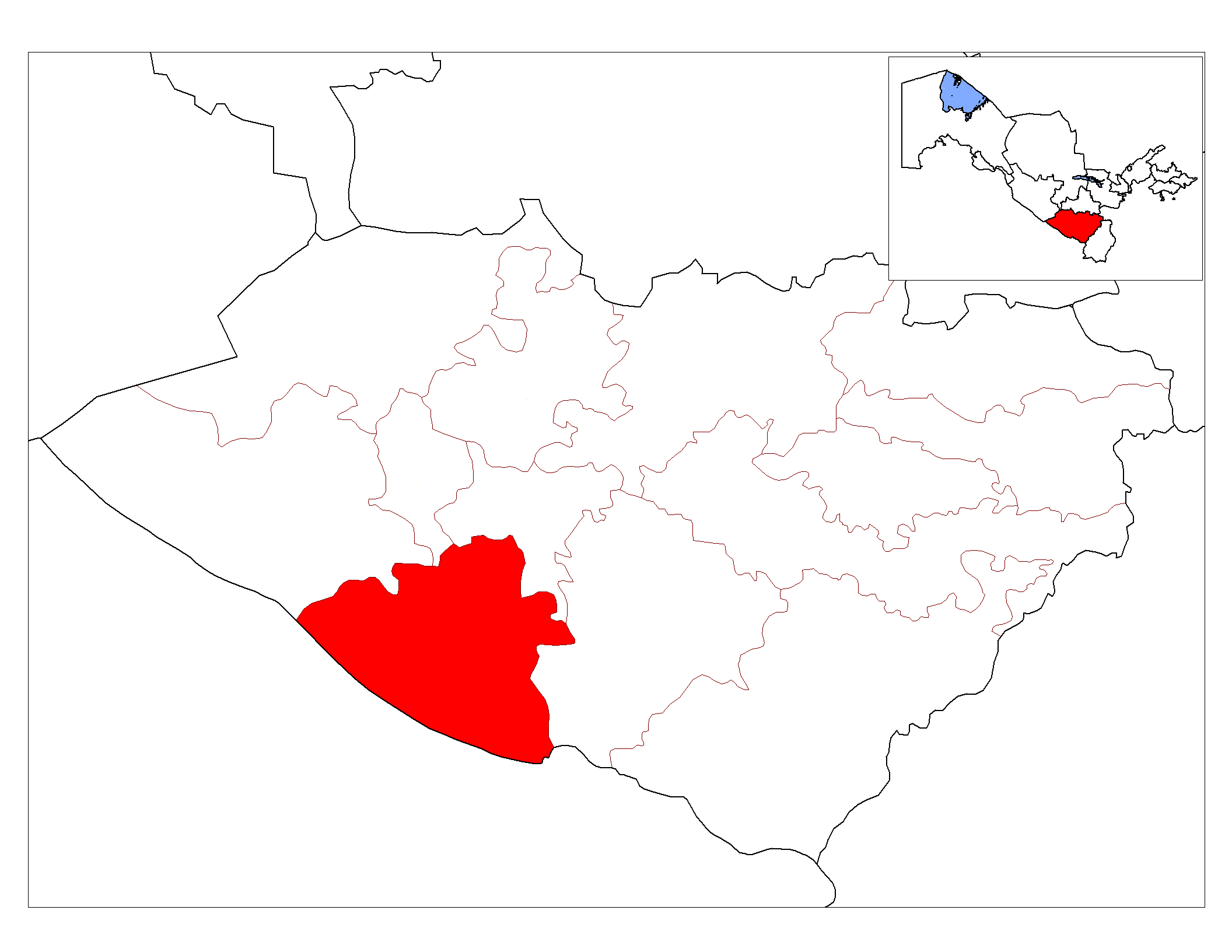
- Country: Uzbekistan
- Region: Qashqadaryo Region
- Capital: Yangi Nishon

Area
  - Total: 2,110 km^{2} (810 sq mi)

Population (2021)
  - Total: 155,500
  - Density: 73.7/km^{2} (191/sq mi)
- Time zone: UTC+5 (UZT)

Nishon District is a district of Qashqadaryo Region in Uzbekistan. The capital lies at Yangi Nishon. It has an area of 2,110 km^{2} (810 sq mi) and its population is 155,500 (2021 est.). The district consists of two cities (Yangi Nishon and Tallimarjon), 9 urban-type settlements (Nuriston, Nishon, Guliston, Oq oltin, Sardoba, Paxtachi, Oydin, Samarqand, Paxtaobod) and 8 rural communities.
