= Muborak =

Muborak Muborak/Муборак
- City
- Location in Uzbekistan
- Coordinates: 39°15′36″N 65°09′00″E
- Country: Uzbekistan
- Region: Qashqadaryo Region
- District: Muborak District
- City status: 1974

Population (2016)
  - Total: 30,100
- Time zone: UTC+5 (UZT)
  - Summer (DST): UTC+5 (not observed)
- Postal code: 180900
- Area code: +998 7567

Muborak (Uzbek: Muborak/Муборак, Russian: Мубарек, romanized: Mubarek) is a small city located in Qashqadaryo Region of Uzbekistan. The city is the administrative center of Muborak District. Its population is 30,100 (2016).

Muborak originally arose in connection with an oil refinery. It received the status of a city in 1974. The word muborak means "gracious" in Uzbek.

Muborak is currently an important oil and gas city in independent Uzbekistan. It is home to the Muborak Gas Processing Plant, one of the largest of its type in the country. The city is also known for its football team Mashʼal.

== History ==
According to a local legend, Muborak got its name from the name of the village of Xoʻjamuborak which had been created in honor of the Islamic scholar Abdullah bin al-Mubarak al-Marwazi. The word muborak means "gracious" in Uzbek.

Muborak originally arose in connection with an oil refinery. It was made into a city in 1974.

== Geography ==
By road Muborak is 520 kilometres (320 mi) southwest of Tashkent.

=== Climate ===
Muborak has a cool arid climate (Köppen climate classification BWk). The city has chilly winters, but very hot and dry summers. The average June temperature is about 28 °C (82 °F). The mean temperature in January is around 5.5 °C (41.9 °F).

Climate data for Muborak (1991–2020)
| Month | Jan | Feb | Mar | Apr | May | Jun | Jul | Aug | Sep | Oct | Nov | Dec | Year |
|---|---|---|---|---|---|---|---|---|---|---|---|---|---|
| Mean daily maximum °C (°F) | 8.0 (46.4) | 11.1 (52.0) | 17.8 (64.0) | 24.9 (76.8) | 31.2 (88.2) | 36.8 (98.2) | 38.5 (101.3) | 37.2 (99.0) | 31.9 (89.4) | 24.2 (75.6) | 15.6 (60.1) | 9.3 (48.7) | 23.9 (75.0) |
| Daily mean °C (°F) | 2.8 (37.0) | 5.1 (41.2) | 11.1 (52.0) | 17.9 (64.2) | 24.2 (75.6) | 29.5 (85.1) | 31.5 (88.7) | 29.5 (85.1) | 23.4 (74.1) | 15.7 (60.3) | 8.6 (47.5) | 3.8 (38.8) | 16.9 (62.4) |
| Mean daily minimum °C (°F) | −1.3 (29.7) | 0.4 (32.7) | 5.6 (42.1) | 11.2 (52.2) | 16.2 (61.2) | 20.5 (68.9) | 22.5 (72.5) | 20.2 (68.4) | 14.4 (57.9) | 7.9 (46.2) | 2.9 (37.2) | −0.6 (30.9) | 10.0 (50.0) |
| Average precipitation mm (inches) | 28.0 (1.10) | 33.8 (1.33) | 32.7 (1.29) | 28.8 (1.13) | 13.8 (0.54) | 1.6 (0.06) | 0.3 (0.01) | 0.3 (0.01) | 0.9 (0.04) | 3.8 (0.15) | 17.1 (0.67) | 18.7 (0.74) | 179.8 (7.08) |
| Average precipitation days (≥ 1.0 mm) | 9 | 9 | 10 | 8 | 6 | 2 | 1 | 1 | 1 | 3 | 6 | 7 | 63 |
Source: NOAA

== Demographics ==
Muborak had a population of 30,100 in 2016. Representatives of many ethnic groups can be found in the town. Uzbeks are the largest ethnic group.

Historical population
| Year | Pop. | ±% p.a. |
|---|---|---|
| 1971 | 3,814 | — |
| 2002 | 23,800 | +6.08% |
| 2016 | 30,100 | +1.69% |

== Economy ==
Muborak was not heavily industrialized during Soviet times: it was a small town specializing in animal husbandry. It has become a notable industrial city in independent Uzbekistan. Currently, it has a large oil and gas industry. The town is home to the Muborak Gas Processing Plant, one of the largest of its type in the country.

== Education ==
Muborak is home to three colleges and one vocational school. There are also several secondary schools in the city.

== Mubarek zone ==
The town was the site of the proposed Crimean Tatar Mubarek zone in the 1980s, although said district never came to fruition.

== Notable people ==
- Artyom Filiposyan, Uzbek professional footballer who plays as a centre-back of Armenian descent.
