= Kasbi District =

Coordinates: 38°57′33″N 65°25′41″E

- District
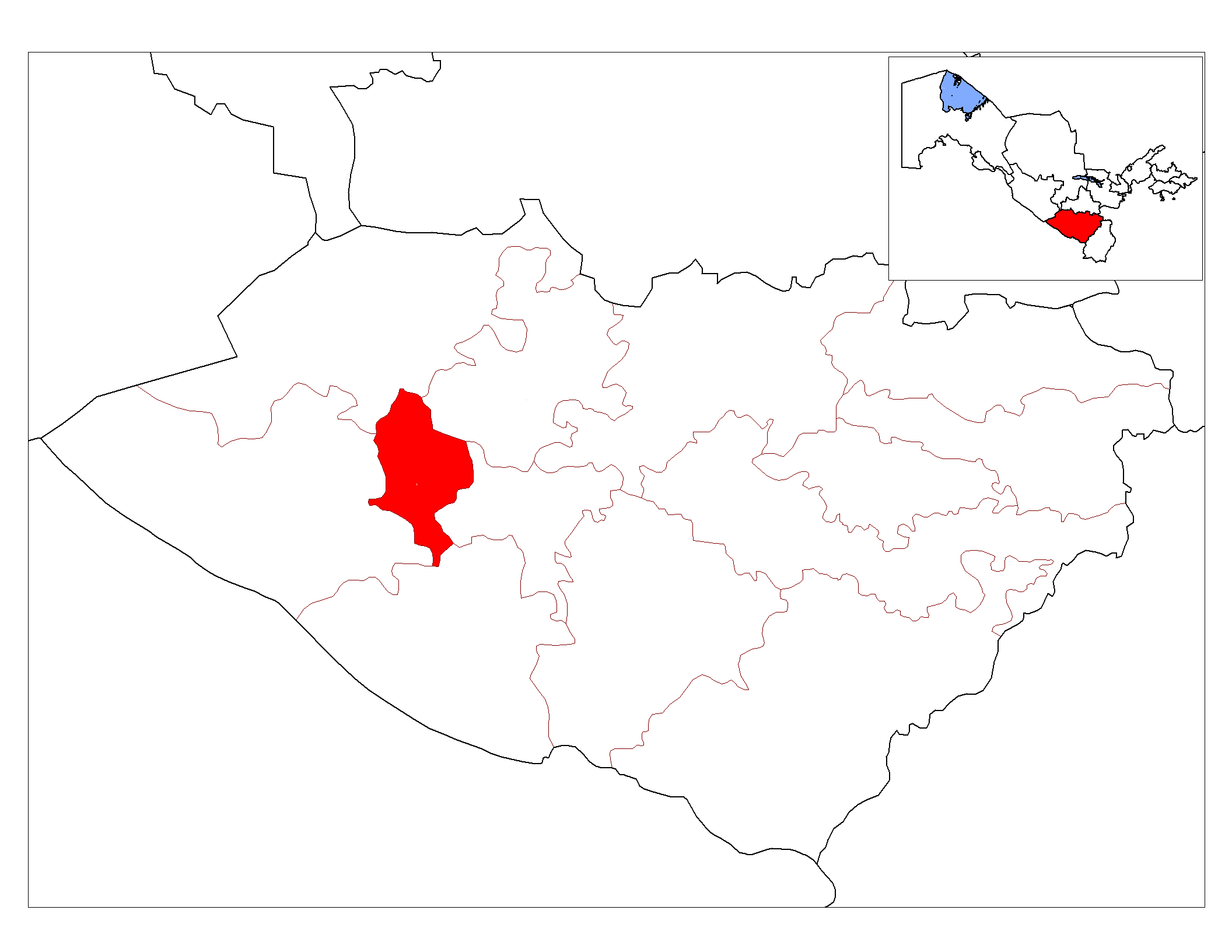
- Country: Uzbekistan
- Region: Qashqadaryo Region
- Capital: Mugʻlon

Area
  - Total: 650 km^{2} (250 sq mi)

Population (2021)
  - Total: 199,800
  - Density: 310/km^{2} (800/sq mi)
- Time zone: UTC+5 (UZT)

Kasbi District (Uzbek: Kasbi tumani) is a district of Qashqadaryo Region in Uzbekistan. The capital lies at the town Mugʻlon. It has an area of 650 km^{2} (250 sq mi) and its population is 199,800 (2021 est.). The district consists of 9 urban-type settlements (Mugʻlon, Denov, Kasbi, Doʻstlik, Yangi qishloq, Xoʻjakasbi, Fazli, Maymanoq, Qatagʻan) and 10 rural communities.
