= Kitob District =

Coordinates: 39°11′59″N 67°05′39″E

Kitob District Kitob tumani
- District
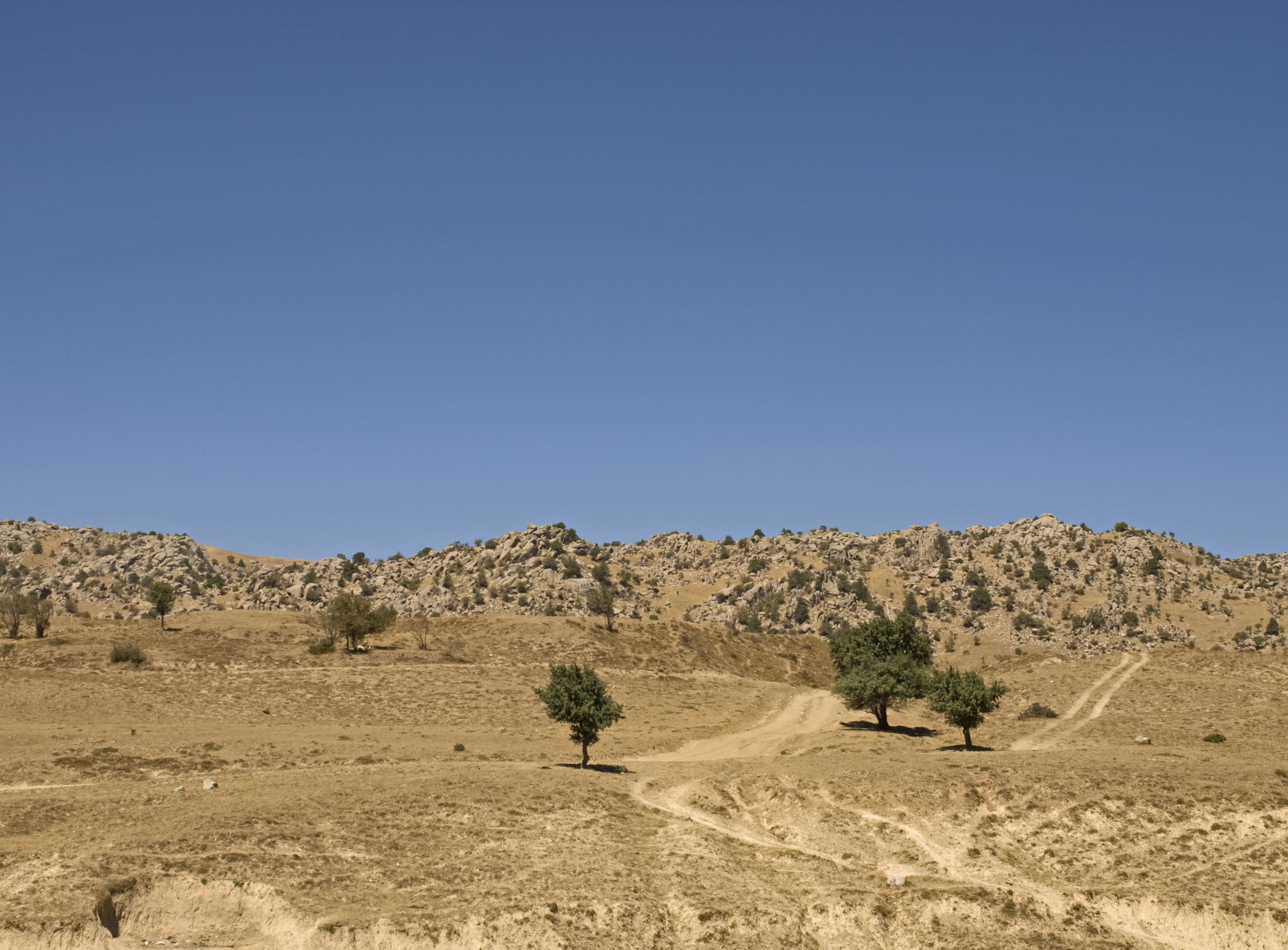
- View from Takhta-Karacha Pass (M39) to the south

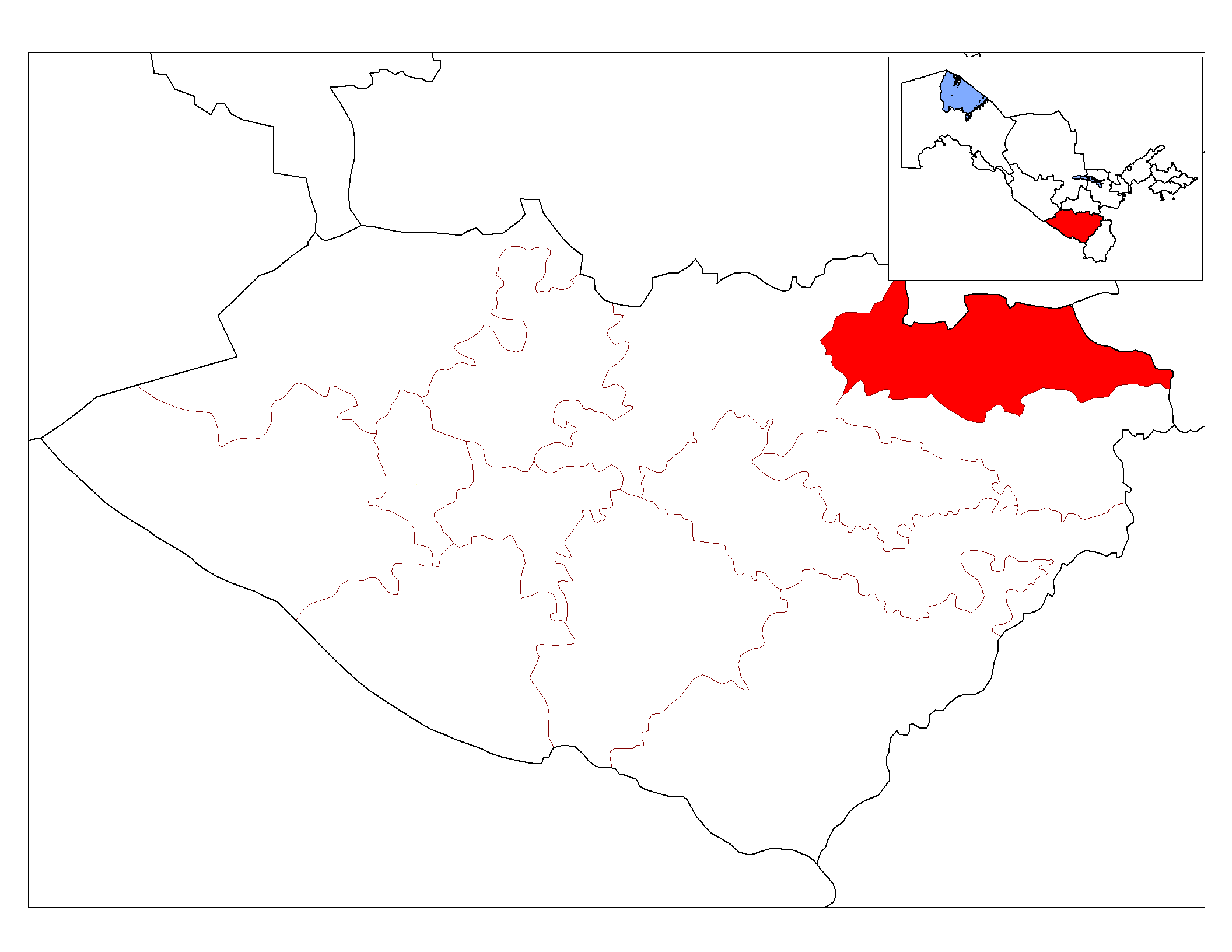
- Country: Uzbekistan
- Region: Qashqadaryo Region
- Capital: Kitob

Area
  - Total: 1,750 km^{2} (680 sq mi)

Population (2021)
  - Total: 266,400
  - Density: 152/km^{2} (394/sq mi)
- Time zone: UTC+5 (UZT)

Kitob District (Uzbek: Kitob tumani) is a district of Qashqadaryo Region in Uzbekistan. The capital lies at the city Kitob. It has an area of 1,750 km^{2} (680 sq mi) and its population is 266,400 (2021 est.). The district consists of one city (Kitob), 13 urban-type settlements (Alaqoʻyliq, Bektemir, Rus qishloq, Baxtdarvozasi, Beshterak, Varganza, Obikanda, Panji, Sariosiyo, Sevaz, Xoji, Yakkatut, Yangiobod) and 12 rural communities.

The district is mainly located on the southern slopes of the Zarafshan Range. The population of the district is overwhelming Tajik, with the Kitob town being almost entirely inhabited by that ethnic group.

In 1979, the Kitab State Geological Reserve was established within the district. It has various protected flora and fauna. Flora includes; Tulipa ingens, Ferula moschata, Acanthophyllum gypsophiloides, Allium stipatatum, Crocus korolkowii, Tulipa turkestanica, Eremurus robustus, Colchicum kesselringii, Sternbergia fischeriana and Iris stolonifera. Birds found in the reserve include; Gyps fulvus, Aegypius monachus, Aquila chrysaetos and Gypaetus barbatus. Animals include Hystrix leucura (Indian crested porcupine), Canis lupus (Grey wolf), Vulpes vulpes (Red fox), Ursus arctos isabellinus (Himalayan brown bear), Martes foina (Stone Marten), Meles meles (European badger) and Sus scrofa (wild boar). A part of Hisar State Reserve is also located in this district.
