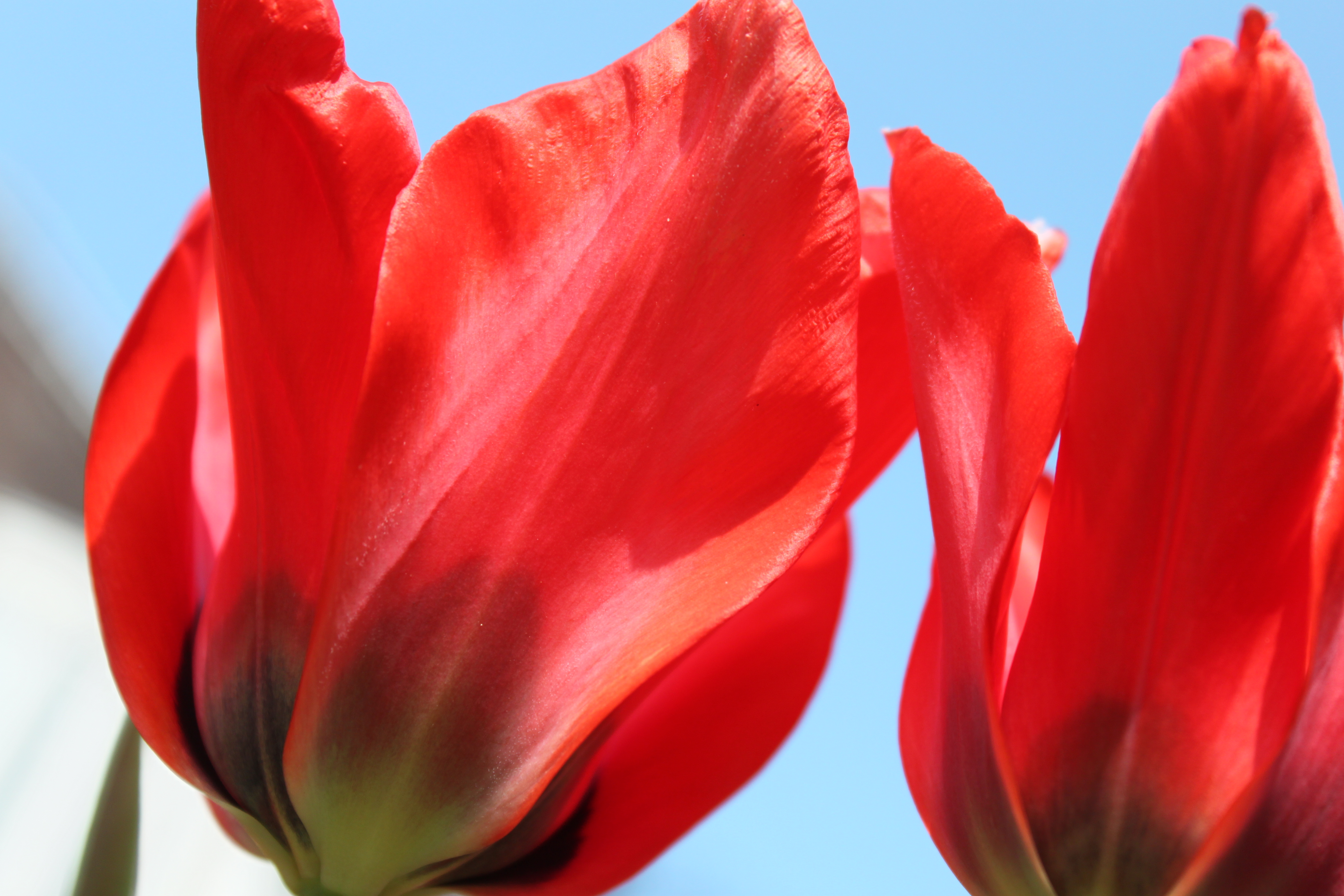
- In the Oosterpark (Amsterdam)

Conservation status
- Near Threatened (IUCN 3.1)

Scientific classification
- Kingdom: Plantae
- Clade: Tracheophytes
- Clade: Angiosperms
- Clade: Monocots
- Order: Liliales
- Family: Liliaceae
- Subfamily: Lilioideae
- Tribe: Lilieae
- Genus: Tulipa
- Species: T. ingens

Binomial name
- Tulipa ingens Hoog

Synonyms
- Tulipa tubergeniana Hoog

= Tulipa ingens =

Species of plant

Tulipa ingens (syn. Tulipa tubergeniana), the huge tulip, is a species of flowering plant in the family Liliaceae, native to Uzbekistan and Tajikistan. A bulbous geophyte reaching 40 cm (16 in), it is found growing in only 45 to 55 stations at elevations from 1,200 to 2,500 m (3,900 to 8,200 ft). The Royal Horticultural Society lists it as a dwarf tulip, stating that it blooms in early spring with black-centered scarlet red flowers.
