= Chiroqchi District =

Chiroqchi
- District
- Chiroqchi tumani
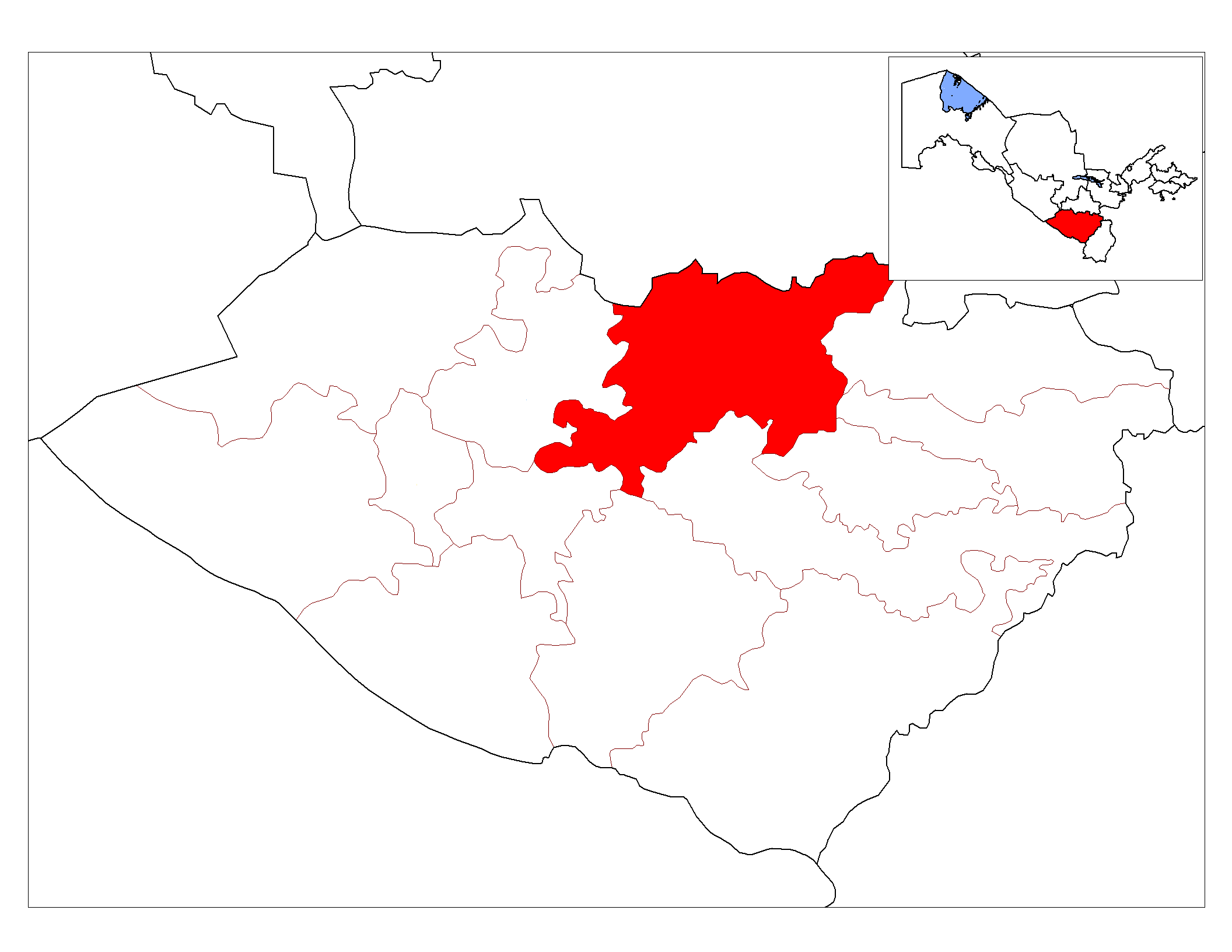
- Coordinates: 39°10′N 66°30′E
- Country: Uzbekistan
- Region: Qashqadaryo Region
- Capital: Chiroqchi

Area
  - Total: 2,840 km^{2} (1,100 sq mi)

Population (2021)
  - Total: 419,800
  - Density: 148/km^{2} (383/sq mi)
- Time zone: UTC+5 (UZT)

Chiroqchi (Uzbek: Chiroqchi, Чироқчи) is a district (Uzbek: tuman) in the north-east of Qashqadaryo Region in Uzbekistan. The administrative center of the district is the city of Chiroqchi. Its area is 2,840 km^{2} (1,100 sq mi), and its population is 419,800 (2021 est.). The district consists of one city (Chiroqchi), 8 urban-type settlements (Jar, Oʻymovut, Dam, Pakandi, Paxtaobod, Chiyal, Koʻkdala, Ayritom) and 20 rural communities.

There is a Polish war cemetery for World War II soldiers in Chiroqchi.
