= Muborak District =

Coordinates: 39°15′30″N 65°11′27″E

- District
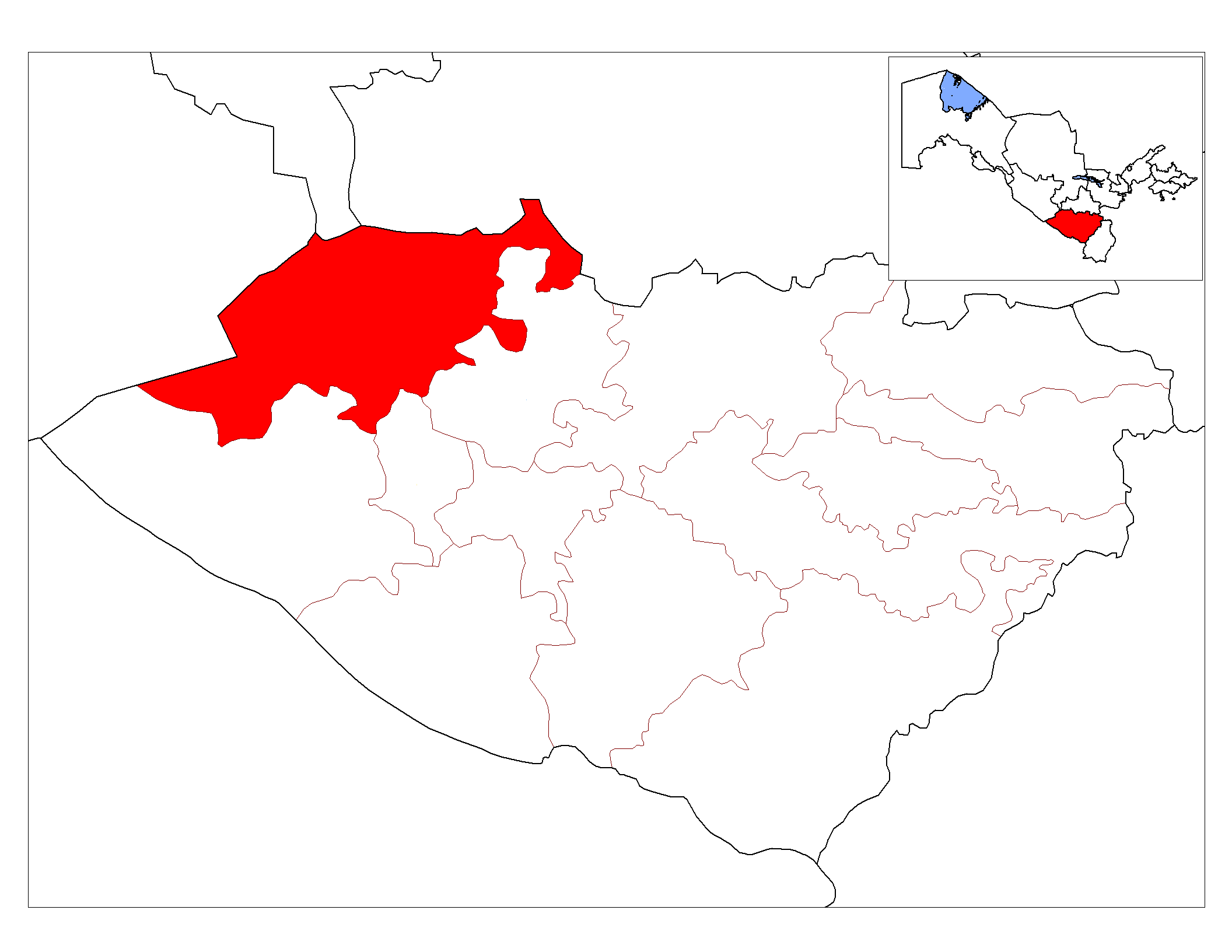
- Country: Uzbekistan
- Region: Qashqadaryo Region
- Capital: Muborak

Area
  - Total: 3,070 km^{2} (1,190 sq mi)

Population (2021)
  - Total: 88,200
  - Density: 28.7/km^{2} (74.4/sq mi)
- Time zone: UTC+5 (UZT)

Muborak District is a district of Qashqadaryo Region in Uzbekistan. The capital lies at the city Muborak. It has an area of 3,070 km^{2} (1,190 sq mi) and its population is 88,200 (2021 est.). The district consists of one city (Muborak), 5 urban-type settlements (Qarliq, Baxt, Qoraqum, Diyonat, Shayx) and 4 rural communities.
