= Qamashi District =

Coordinates: 38°47′35″N 66°28′29″E

- District
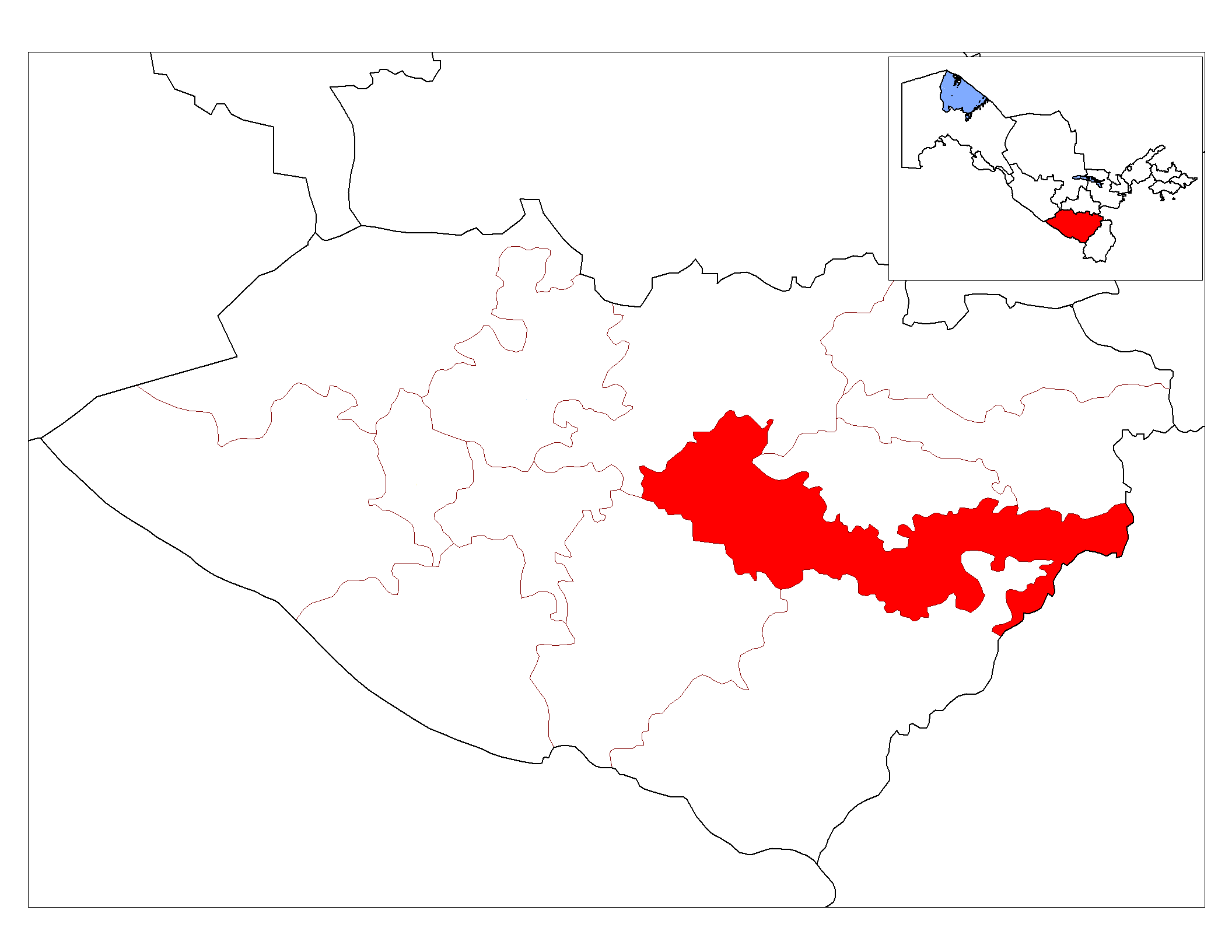
- Country: Uzbekistan
- Region: Qashqadaryo Region
- Capital: Qamashi

Area
  - Total: 2,660 km^{2} (1,030 sq mi)

Population (2021)
  - Total: 274,600
  - Density: 103/km^{2} (267/sq mi)
- Time zone: UTC+5 (UZT)

Qamashi District (Uzbek: Qamashi tumani) is a district of Qashqadaryo Region in Uzbekistan. The capital lies at Qamashi. It has an area of 2,660 km^{2} (1,030 sq mi) and its population is 274,600 (2021 est.). The district consists of one city (Qamashi), 5 urban-type settlements (Balandchayla, Qoratepa, Qiziltepa, Sarbozor, Badahshon) and 11 rural communities.
