= Qashqadaryo Region =

Region of southeastern Uzbekistan

Kashkadarya Region Qashqadaryo viloyati Қашқадарё вилояти (Uzbek)
- Region
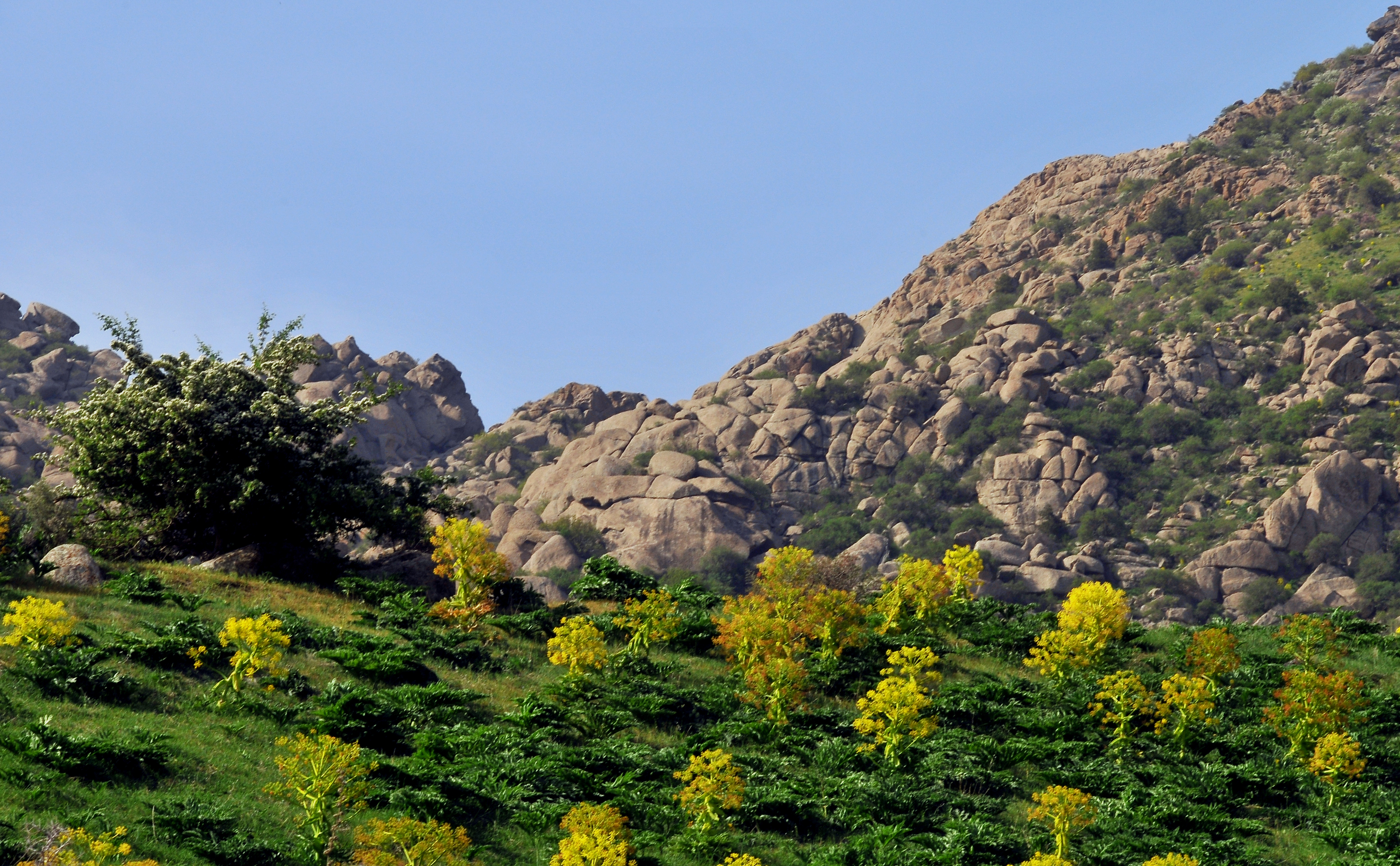
- Qashqadaryo Region

- Qashqadaryo in Uzbekistan
- Coordinates: 38°50′N 66°50′E
- Country: Uzbekistan
- Capital: Qarshi

Government
  - Hokim: Murotjon Azimov

Area
  - Total: 28,568 km^{2} (11,030 sq mi)
- Elevation: 480 m (1,570 ft)

Population (2022)
  - Total: 3,408,345
  - Density: 119.31/km^{2} (309.00/sq mi)
- Time zone: UTC+5 (East)
- ISO 3166 code: UZ-QA
- Districts: 13
- Cities: 12
- Towns: 117
- Villages: 1041
- Website: www.qashqadaryo.uz

Qashqadaryo Region (Note: Uzbek: Қашқадарё вилояти, romanized: Qashqadaryo viloyati, IPA: [qaʃˌqadarˈjɔ ʋɪ̆lɔˌjæˈtʰɪ̆]; Tajik: вилояти Қашқадарё, romanized: viloyati Qashqadaryo; Turkmen: Кашкадаря велаяты, romanized: Kaşkadarýa welaýaty; Karakalpak: Қашқадәря уәлаяты, romanized: Qashqadárya wálayatı) (Note: Formerly called Kashkadarya Oblast (from Russian Кашкадарьинская область).) is one of the regions of Uzbekistan, located in the south-eastern part of the country in the basin of the river Qashqadaryo and on the western slopes of the Pamir-Alay mountains. It borders with Tajikistan, Turkmenistan, Samarqand Region, Bukhara Region and Surxondaryo Region. It covers an area of 28,570 km^{2}. The population is an estimated 3,408,345 (2022), with 57% living in rural areas. The regional capital is Qarshi (278,300 inhabitants).Created in 1964, it consists largely of the Karshi Steppe, an extensive foothill plain intersected by the Kashka River.

== Administrative divisions ==
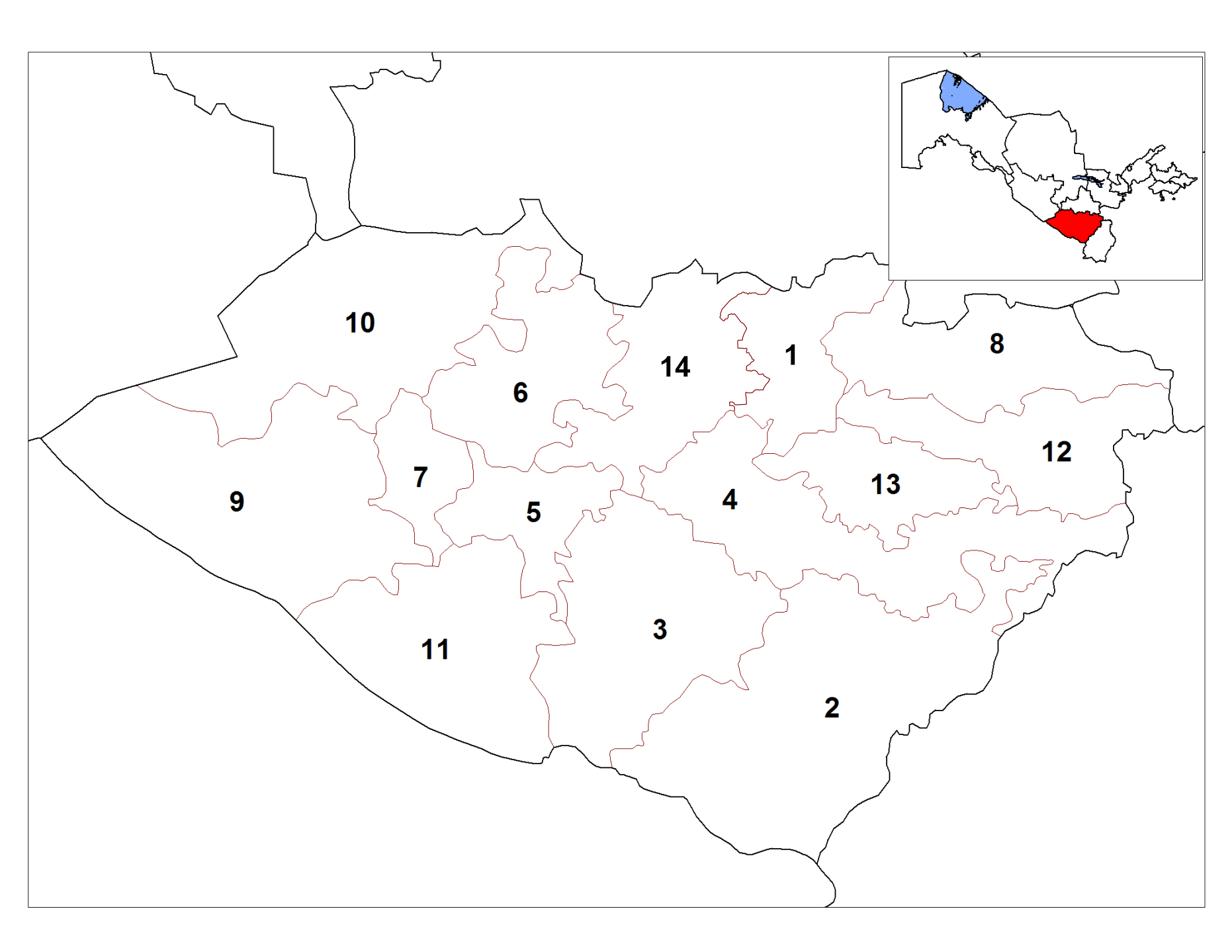
Districts of Kashkadarya Region

The Qashqadaryo Region consists of 13 districts (listed below) and two district-level cities: Qarshi and Shahrisabz.

	District name	District capital
1	Chiroqchi District	Chiroqchi
2	Dehqonobod District	Qorashina
3	Gʻuzor District	Gʻuzor
4	Qamashi District	Qamashi
5	Qarshi District	Beshkent
6	Koson District	Koson
7	Kasbi District	Mugʻlon
8	Kitob District	Kitob
9	Mirishkor District	Yangi Mirishkor
10	Muborak District	Muborak
11	Nishon District	Yangi Nishon
12	Shahrisabz District	Shahrisabz
13	Yakkabogʻ District	Yakkabogʻ
14	Ko'kdala District	Ko'kdala

There are 12 cities (Qarshi, Shahrisabz, Gʻuzor, Qamashi, Beshkent, Koson, Kitob, Muborak, Yangi Nishon, Tallimarjon, Chiroqchi, Yakkabogʻ) and 117 urban-type settlements in the Qashqadaryo Region.

== Geography ==
The climate is a typically arid continental climate and partly semi-tropical. Region involves a number of rivers, mountain ranges(Hisar), reserves (Kitab State Geological Reserve, Hisar State Reserve) and lakes.

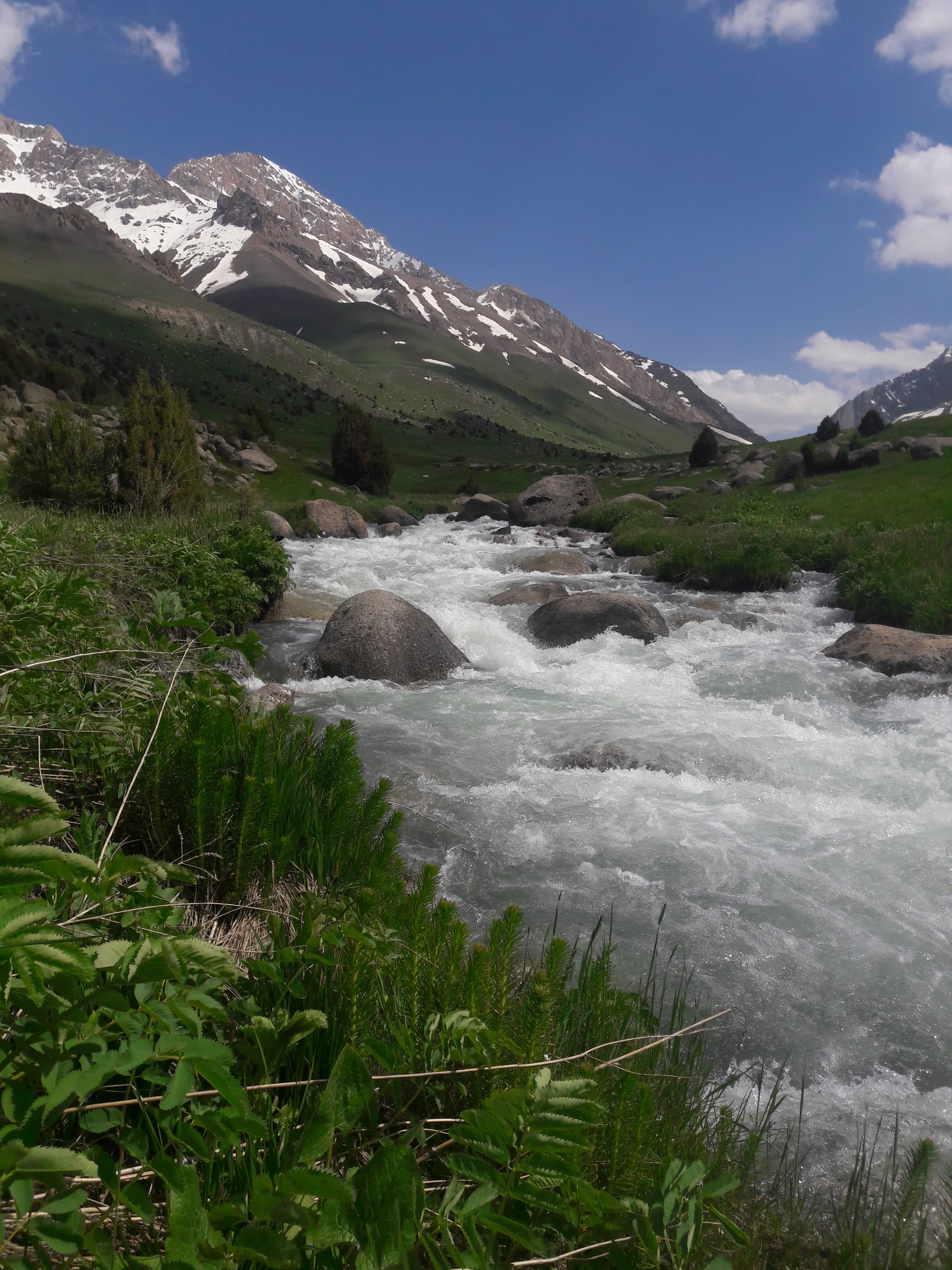
Natural landscape of Kashkadarya region

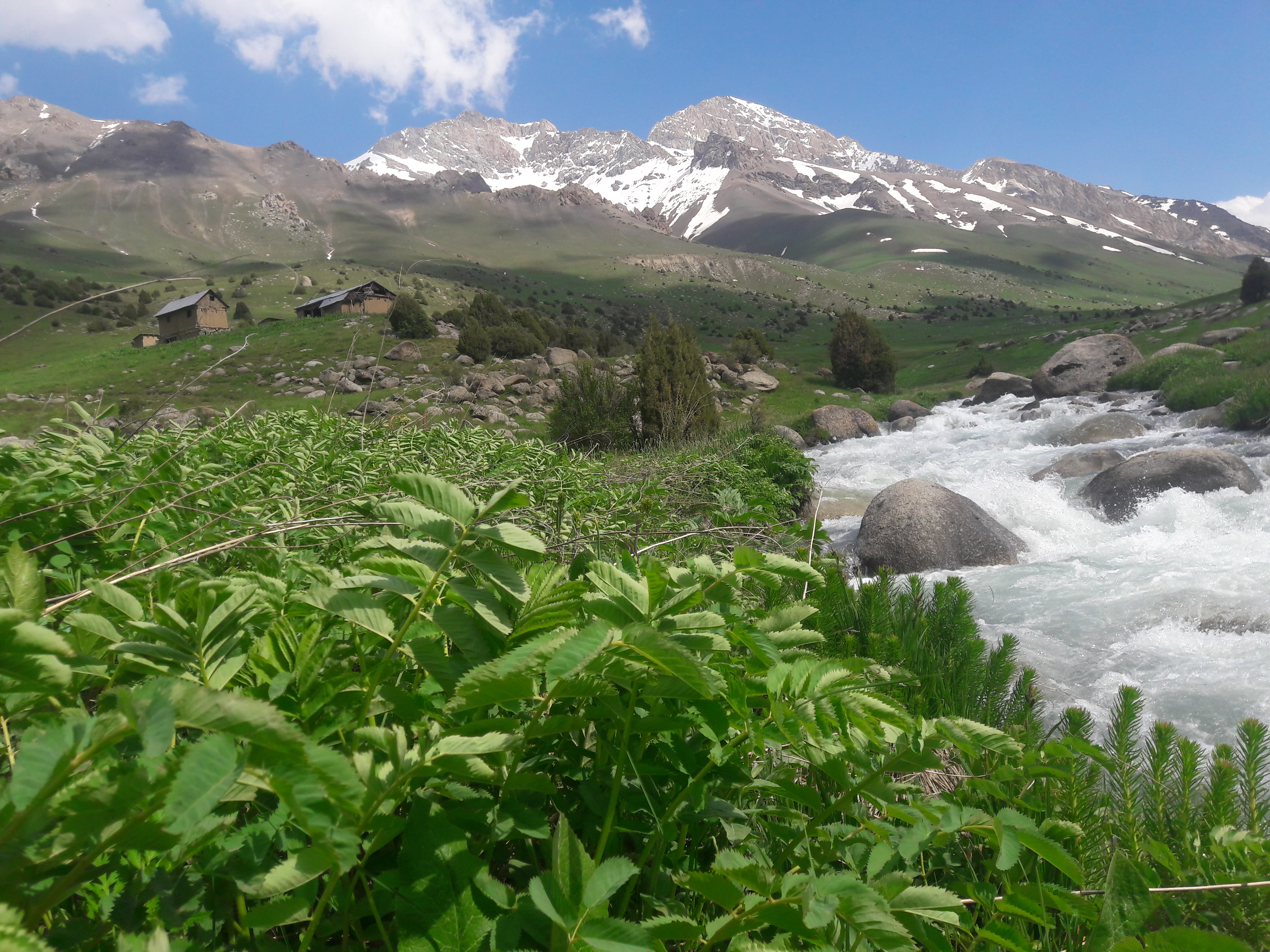
Shahrisabz district, Kashkadarya region

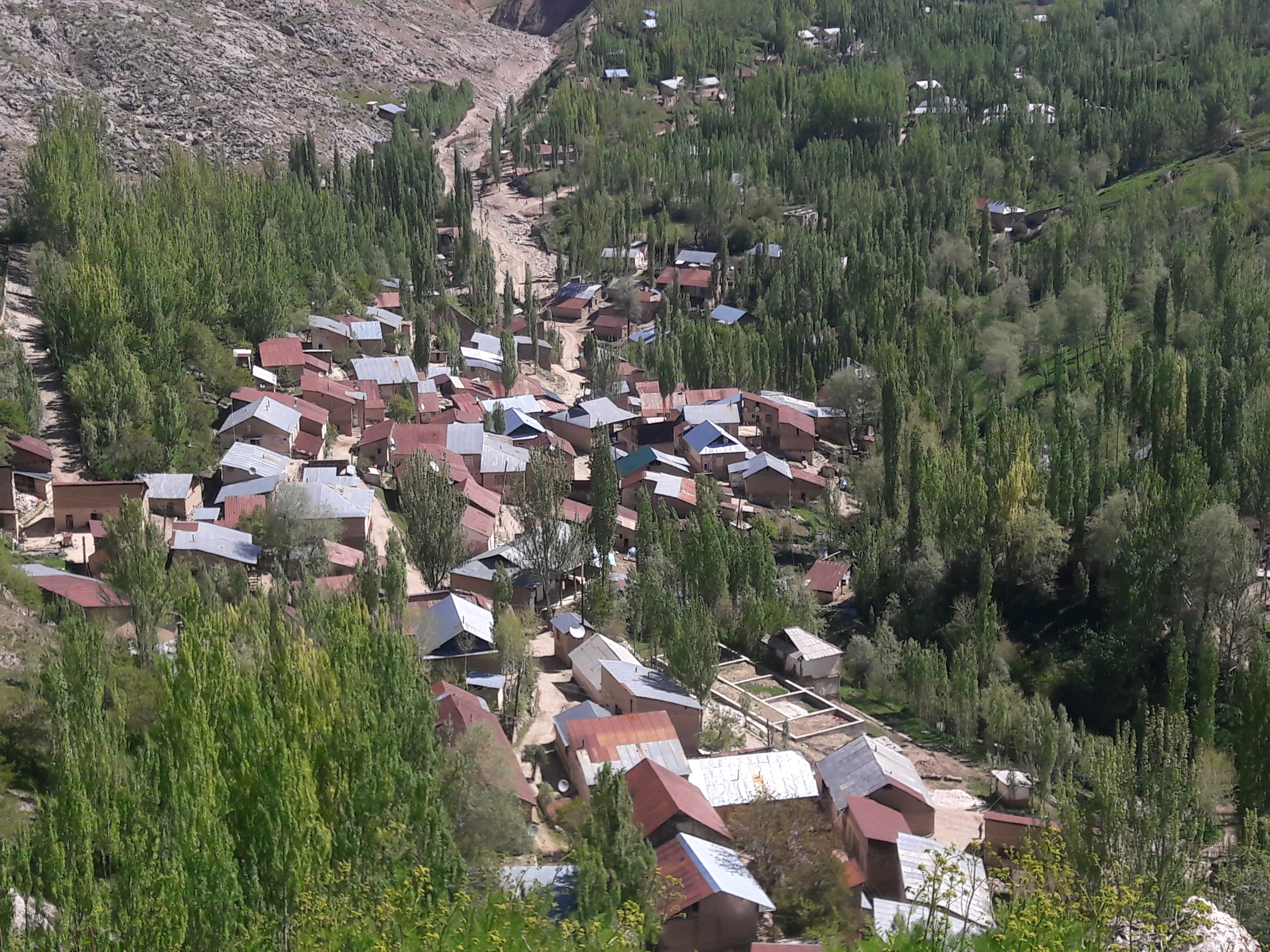
Kol village

== Historical buildings ==
The Mubarak Mervazi Mausoleum was built in the 14th century. It is located in the "Sariqqishloq" neighborhood in the Mubarak district of the Kashkadarya region. By the decision of the Cabinet of Ministers of the Republic of Uzbekistan on 4 October 2019, it was included in the national list of immovable property objects of tangible cultural heritage - under state protection. Mausoleum of Hazrat Sultan is a memorial site located in the Shut village of the Koʻhsor neighborhood in the Kitob district of Qashqadaryo region, dating back to the 12th to 13th centuries.

== Economy ==
Natural resources include significant petroleum and natural gas reserves, with the Muborak Oil and Gas Processing Plant as the region's largest industry. Other industry includes wool processing, textiles, light industry, food processing and construction materials. Major agricultural activities include cotton, various crops and livestock. The irrigation infrastructure is very well developed with the large Tallimarjon Reservoir as a reliable water source.

The region has a well-developed transport infrastructure, with over 350 km of railways and 4000 km of surfaced roads.

== Culture ==
The city of Shahrisabz, the birthplace of Amir Timur, is the main tourist attraction in the region.

== Main sights ==
Mubarak Mervazi Mausoleum is a cultural heritage object located in Uzbekistan and recognized as a significant historical site. The object was built in the 14th century and is situated in the "Sariqqishloq" neighborhood of the Mubarak district in the Qashqadaryo region. By the decision of the Cabinet of Ministers of the Republic of Uzbekistan on 4 October 2019, the immovable property objects of the tangible cultural heritage were included in the national list — they are under state protection.
