= Chakar Mosque (Karshi) =

Mosque in Karshi, Uzbekistan

- Chaqar masjidi
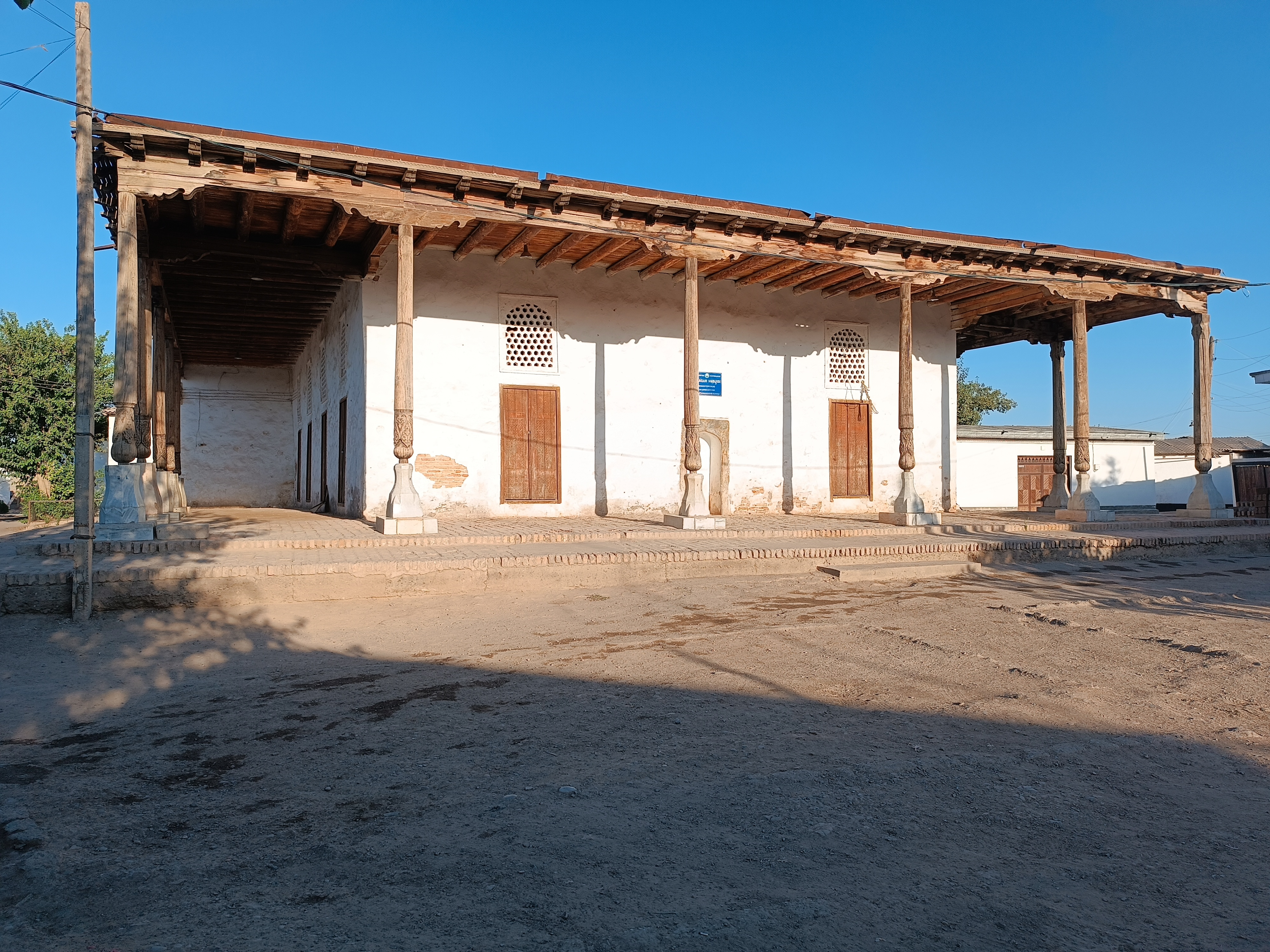
- Interactive map of the Chakar Mosque area

General information
- Status: under the protection of the state
- Type: Madrasah
- Architectural style: Central Asian architecture
- Location: Karshi, Uzbekistan
- Coordinates: 38°52′24″N 65°48′07″E
- Opened: XVIII

Chakar Mosque is an architectural monument located in Chakar MFY, Karshi city, Kashkadarya region. In accordance with the decision of the President of the Republic of Uzbekistan "On measures to fundamentally improve activities in the field of protection of tangible cultural heritage objects" dated December 19, 2018.

== History ==
Chakar Mosque is located in the Old Town of Karshi. The mosque was built in the 18th century and is currently in a dilapidated state and is under the auspices of the Chakar neighborhood. Chaqar mosque and Sharifboy madrasah were included in the national list by the decision of the Cabinet of Ministers dated October 4, 2019 No.846 "On approving the national list of immovable property objects of tangible cultural heritage". However, the year 2022 caused critical discussions on social networks due to the lack of repair and restoration works in the Sharifboy Madrasah and Chakar Mosque. According to him, the condition of the madrasah has reached an emergency.

== Architecture ==
The mosque was entered through the doors from the porch. The walls are without patterns, plastered with ganj, and a pattern carved on marble can be seen in the mihrab. In the main central part of the building, carved columns support the ceiling timbers, and the floor protection is made of marble. The outer part of the mosque is built in the iwan style, the columns support the iwans. The wooden pillars of the mosque are skillfully carved with flower images and different shapes. Such traditionalism can also be seen in Bukhara architecture.

== Gallery ==
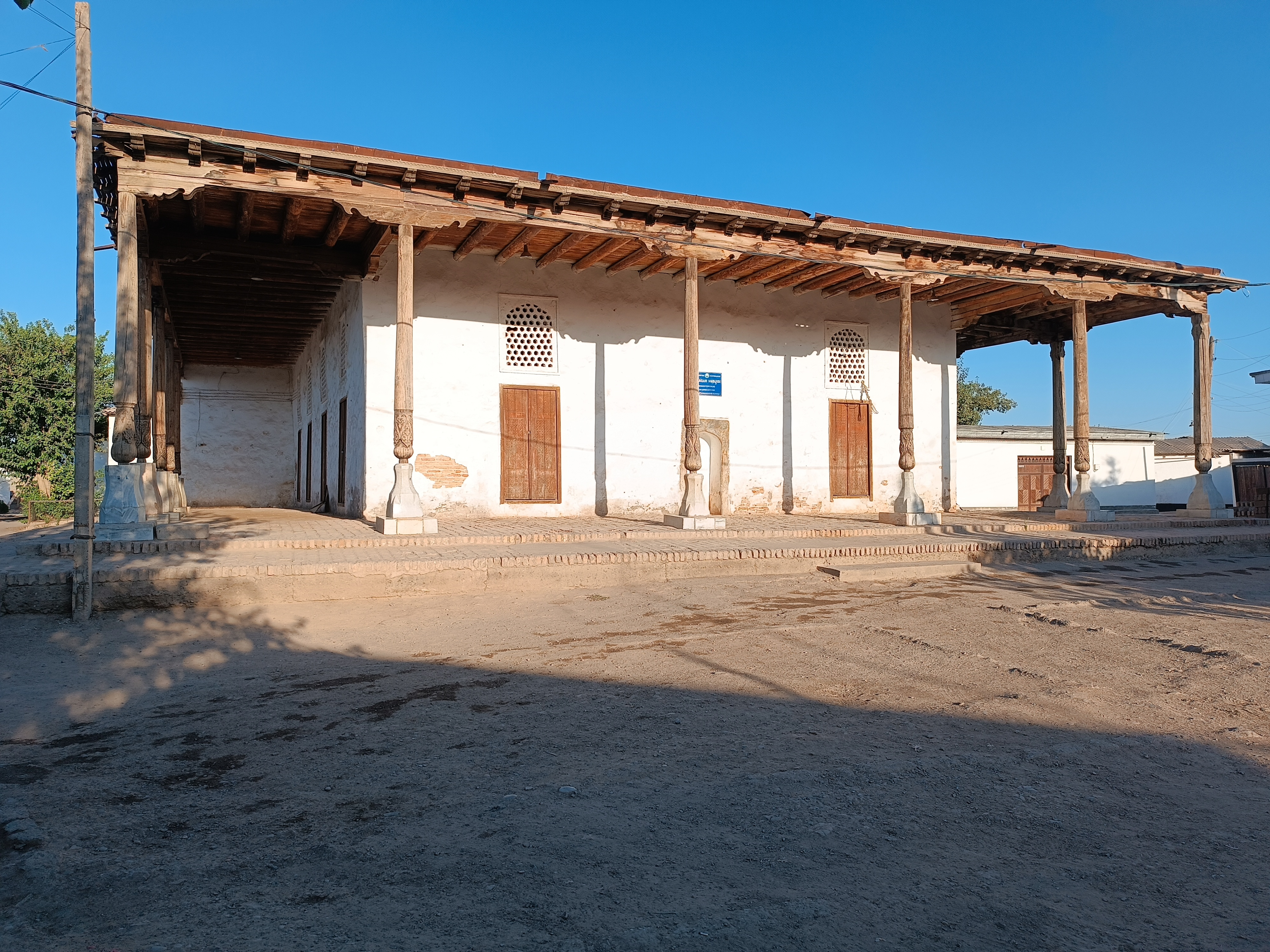
Chakar Mosque full building view

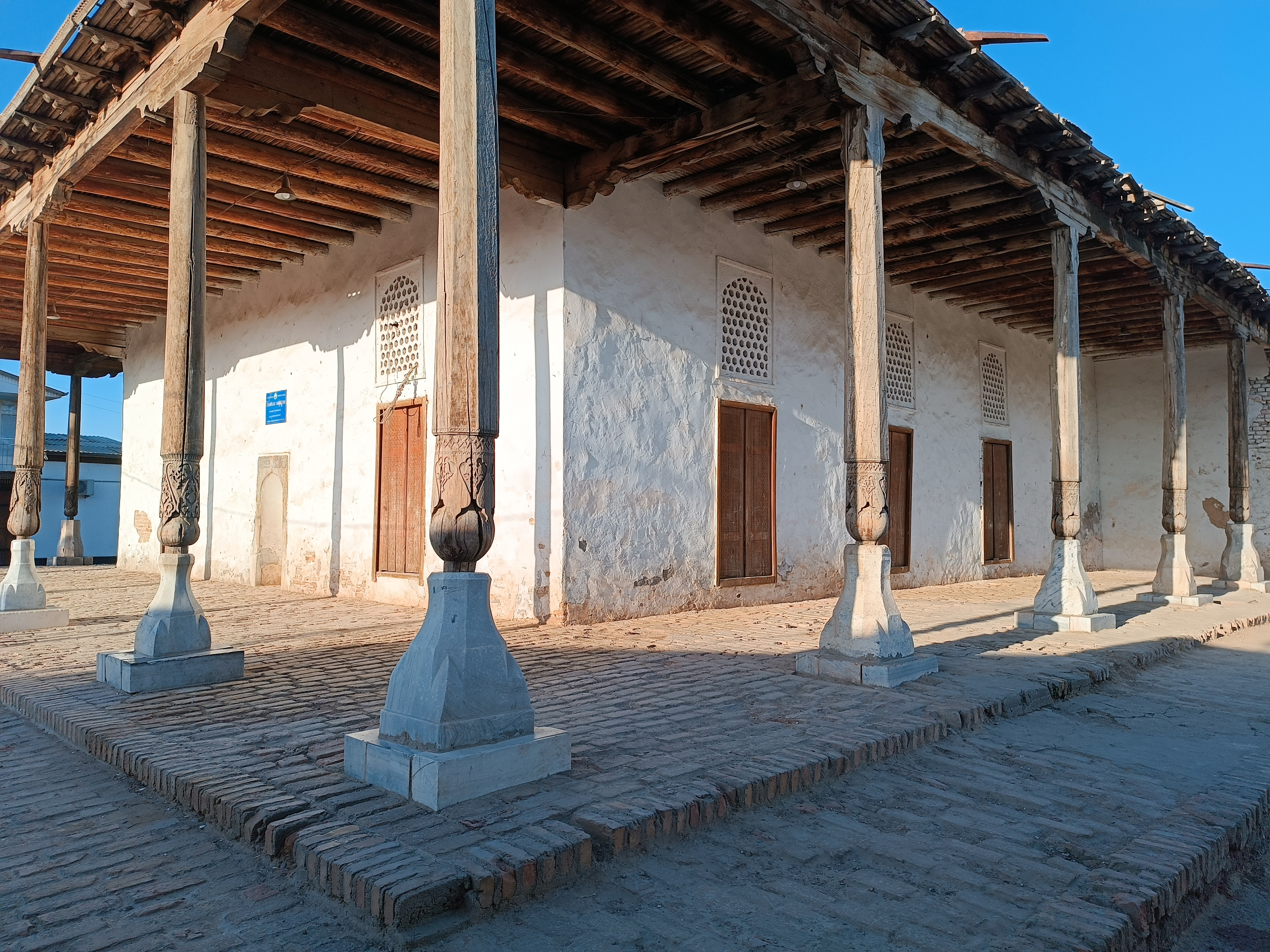
View of the Chakar Mosque from the southeast

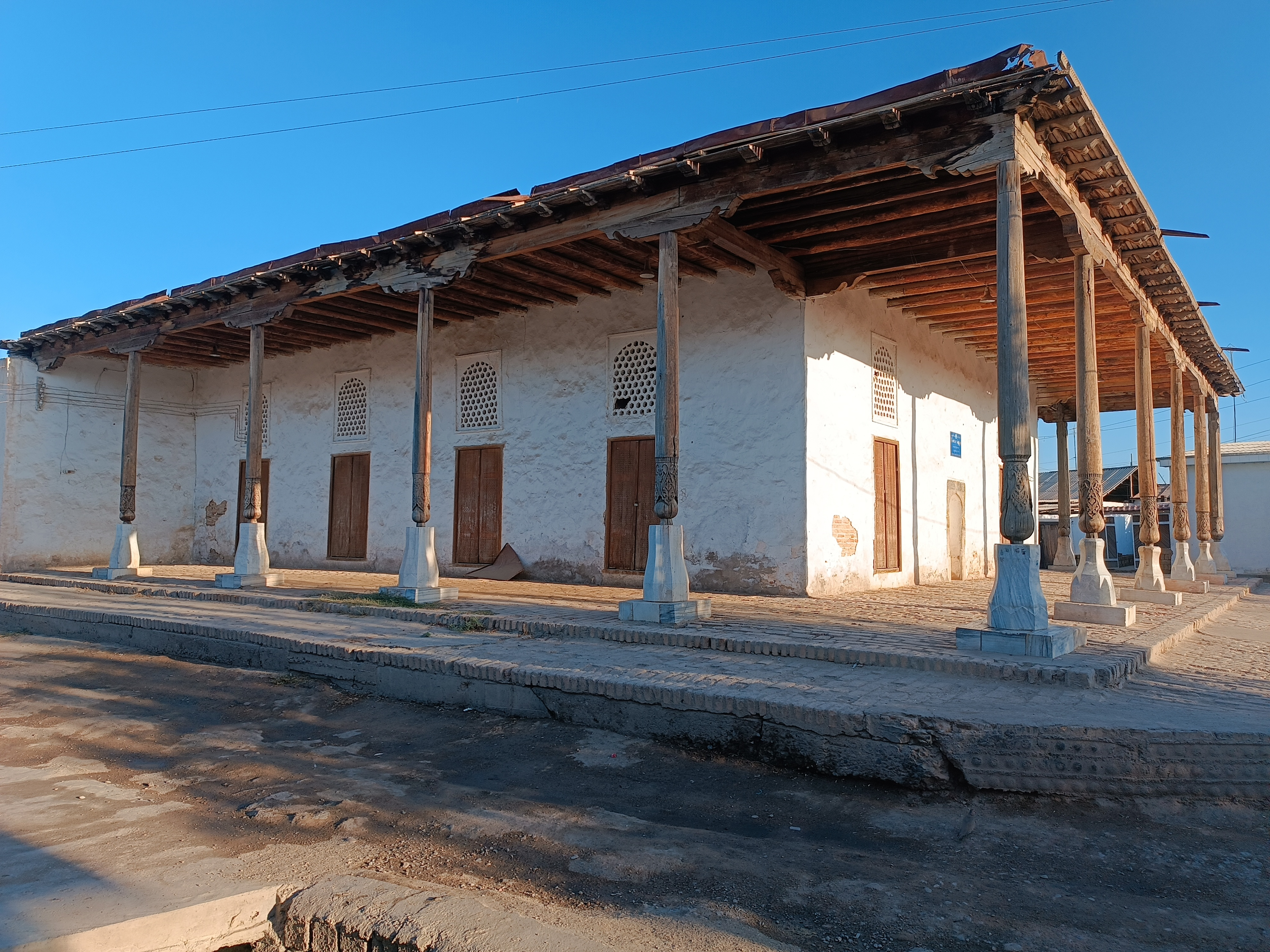
View of the Chakar Mosque from the north-west side

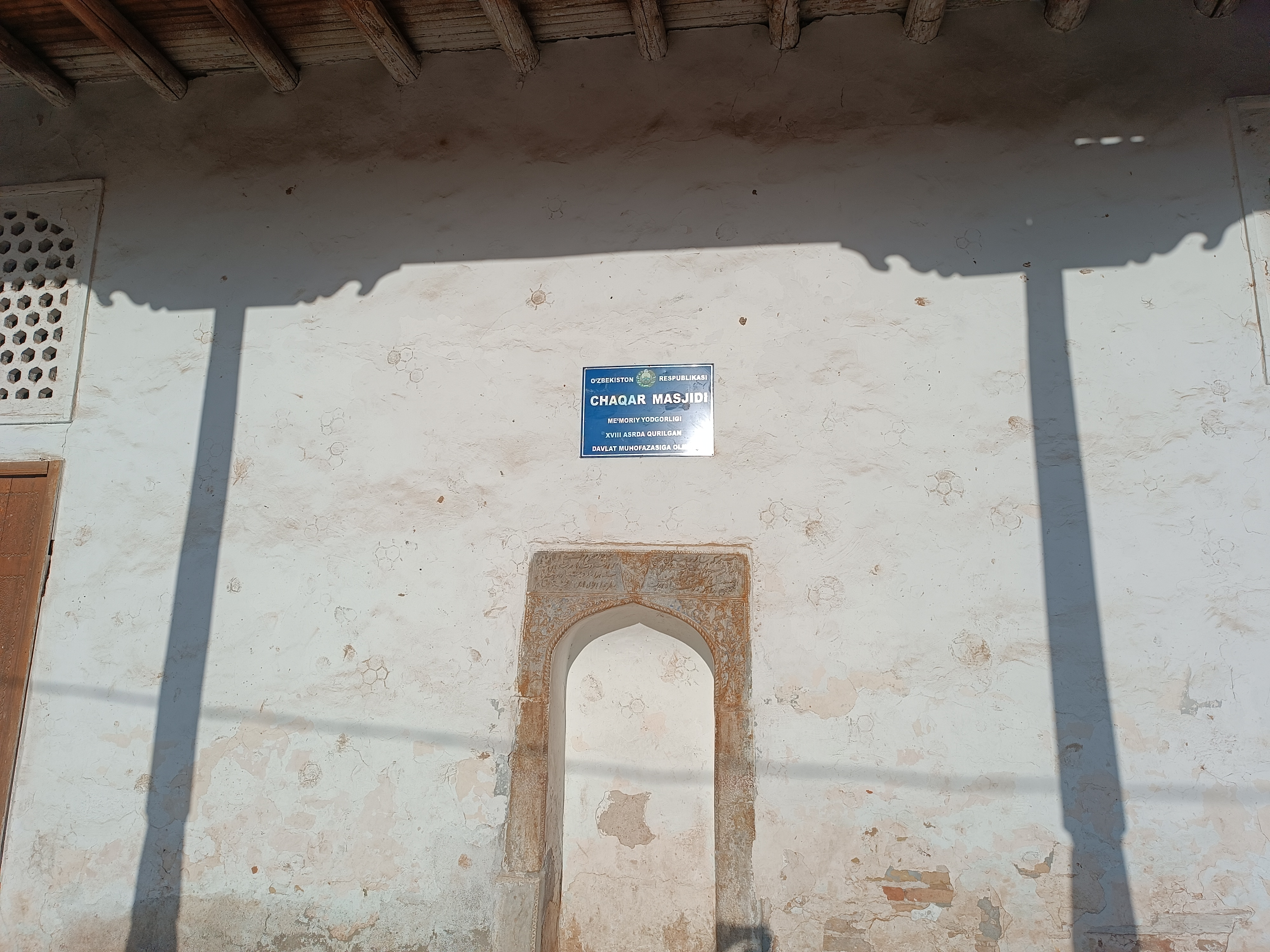
A view of the facade of the Chakar Mosque

== Literatures ==
Poyon Ravshanov (2006). Qarshi tarixi (Yangi asr avlodi nashriyoti ed.). Toshkent. p. 647. ISBN 5-633-01899-0.

Jumanazar A. K. (2007). Nasaf (Alisher Navoiy nomidagi Oʻzbekiston Milliy kutubxonasi nashriyoti ed.). Toshkent. p. 204.
