= Qarshi (disambiguation) =

Qarshi is a city in Uzbekistan and the capital Qashqadaryo region.

Qarshi or Karshi may also refer to:

- Qarshi District, Qashqadaryo Region, Uzbekistan
- Qarshi Airport, Qarshi, Uzbekistan
- Qarshi Bridge, bridge in Qashqadaryo Region, Uzbekistan
- Markaziy Stadium (Qarshi) or Qarshi Stadium, Qarshi, Uzbekistan
- Qarshi Industries, Lahore, Pakistan
  - Qarshi University, Lahore, Pakistan

== See also ==
- Qashqadaryo (disambiguation)
