= Gʻoziyon Madrasa =

Madrasa in Bukhara, Uzbekistan

Coordinates: 39.7701°N 64.4135°E

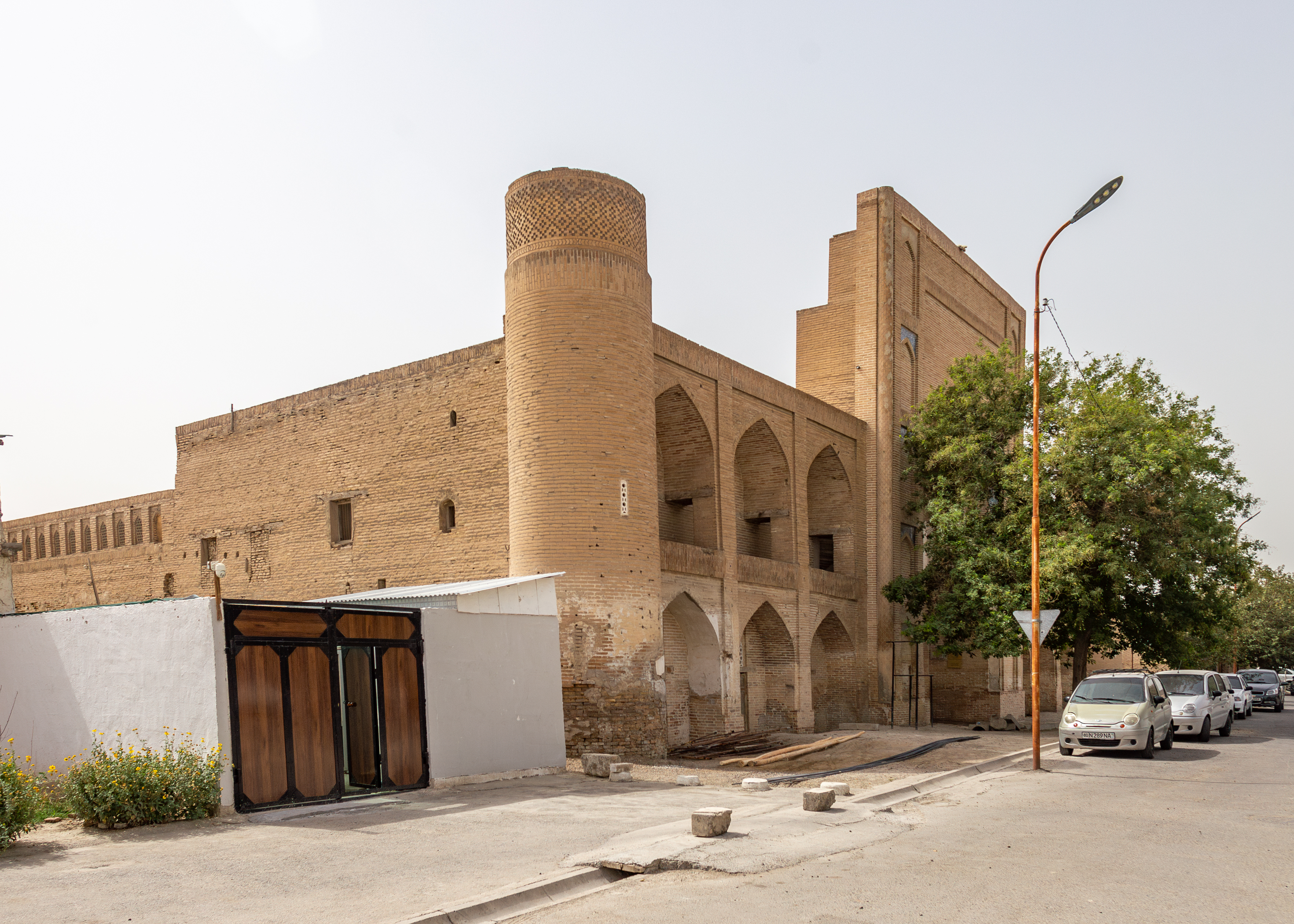
Goziyon madrasa, Bukhara, Uzbekistan

The Gʻoziyon Madrasa (lit. 'fighters for faith'), also known as the Gʻoziyon Kalon (lit. 'Great Gaziyon') is an architectural monument and a madrasa in Bukhara, Uzbekistan. It was built during the 15th and 17th centuries.

It operated as a Muslim school in the 18th and 19th centuries, and students from various cities arrived to study.

It is included in the UNESCO World Heritage List as part of the historical center of Bukhara city.

== Location ==
G‘oziyon madrasa is located in the city center, in the ancient quarter of G‘oziyon in Bukhara. This name comes from the respected tomb of one of the 44 Bukharan martyrs, Imam Gʻoziy, a fighter for faith, located in the alley. The madrasa is located at the intersection of Jo‘yibor and Imam G‘azoliy Valiy streets. Next to the madrasa, there is the Xoja-Govkushon architectural ensemble and the “Hovli Poyon” hotel, which is located in a building built in the 19th century.

The buildings of the madrasa were used for students’ accommodation, and the classes were held at the Mullo Muhammad Sharif madrasa in the same quarter. This building adjoins the half-wooden (“yogʻoch”) Chubin madrasa. The gathering of the madrasas at this point indicates that this quarter was one of the educational centers of Bukhara.

== Description ==
This madrasa, known from the 15th century, together with the “Gʻoziyon xurd” (small Gʻoziyon) madrasa, formed a complex of twin madrasas. The time of the formation of the ensemble corresponds to 1535. The modern building of the Gʻoziyan madrasa (1730–34, see below) is a one-storey building, with a high monumental facade built in the local Bukhara architectural style, which is smaller than the other madrasas of Bukhara. The old part of the building is arched and partially decorated with ornaments. The complex was built by Usta Fathulloh at the expense of Muhammad Sharif funds.

The highest point of the dome interior is decorated with gold and a majolica inscription with a high poetic dedication consisting of traditional metaphors, honoring the donor Muhammad Sharif and the master teacher Fathulloh. This building was completed in the fourth year after the start of construction. The verse inscribed on the dome arch says “Az Muhammad Sharif be-in nishon” (“This is a sign from Muhammad Sharif”), which contains the chronogram of the completion of the construction, which indicates the year 1146 AH (1733–34).

The building itself is asymmetrical, with walls made of bricks. The arched front of the old part of the building is glazed. The ceiling of the outer room of the madrasa is beautifully decorated with carved marble.

== See also ==
- Farjak Madrasa
- Hofiz Qoʻngʻirot Madrasa
- Husayni Madrasa
- Dor Ush-Shifo Madrasa
- Eshoni Pir Madrasa

== Bibliography ==
- Saakov, V (1996). Buxoro tarixi. Tashkent: Sharq nashriyoti.
- Markaziy Osiyo durdonalari. Buxoro boʻyicha tarixiy qoʻllanma. Bukhara. 2012.
- Buxoro (in Uzbek). Tashkent: O‘zbekiston nashriyoti. 2000.
- Narshaxiy, Muhammad (1897). Buxoro tarixi. Tashkent.
- Saakov, V (1991). Buxoro meʼmorchilik durdonalari. Bukhara: Kitobxon.
- Almeev, Robert (1996). Qadimgi Buxoro tarixi. Tashkent.
