= Qashqadaryo =

Qashqadaryo may refer to:

- Qashqadaryo (river), a river in Uzbekistan
- Qashqadaryo Region, an administrative region of Uzbekistan
- Qashqadaryo (town), part of Qashqadaryo Region's capital city Qarshi
- Kashkadarian Arabic, a variety of Arabic in Central Asia

== See also ==
- Qarshi (disambiguation)
