= Abdulazizkhoja Madrasa =

Madrasa in Uzbekistan

Coordinates: 38.870199°N 65.806678°E

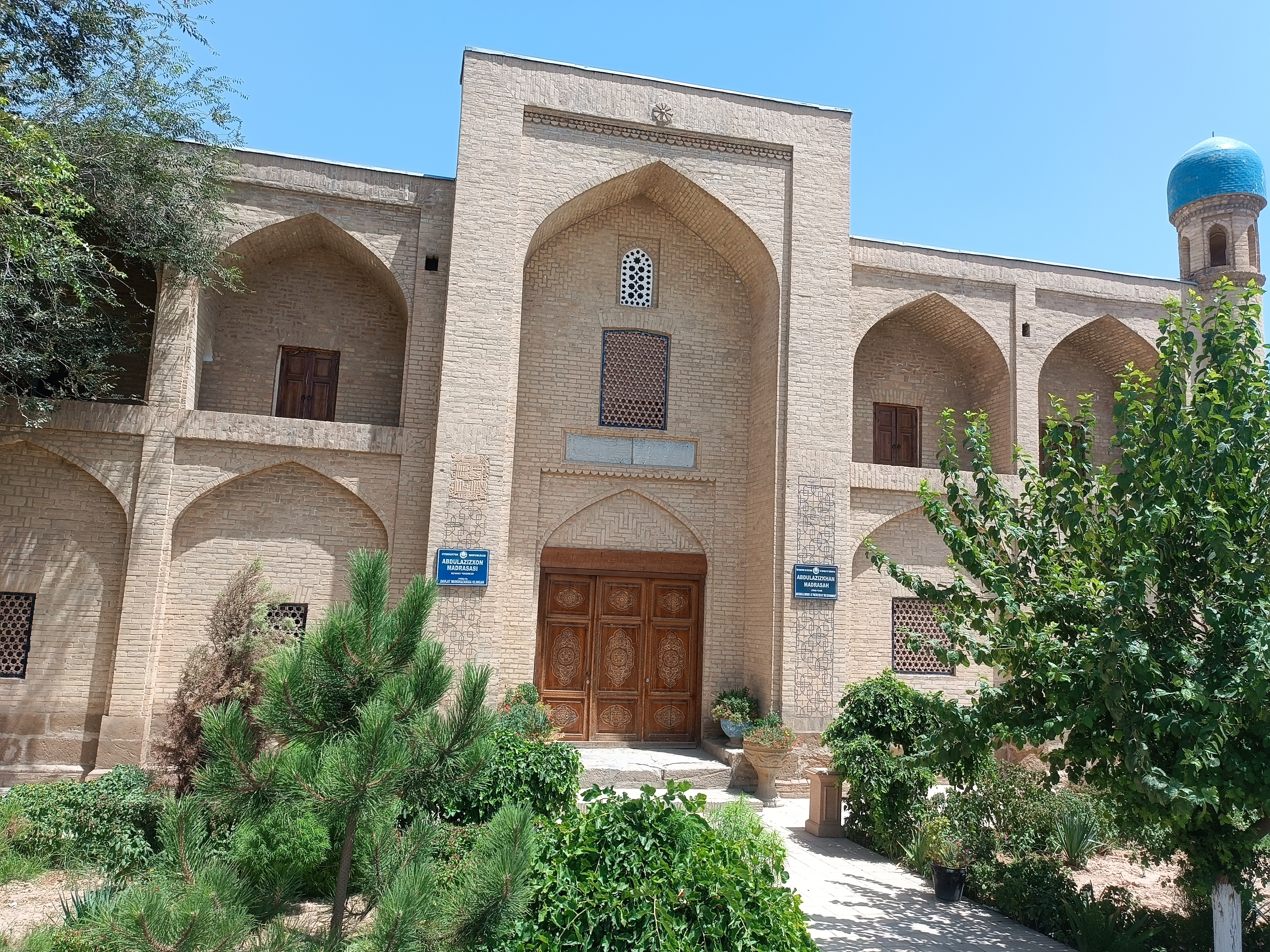
Khuzha Abdulazizkhan madrassah

Abdulazizkhoja Madrasa (Uzbek: Abdulazizxoʻja madrasasi) is a memorial monument according to the Decree of the President of the Republic of Uzbekistan "On Measures to Radically Improve the Activities in the Field of Preservation of Material Cultural Heritage Objects" dated December 19, 2018, PQ-4068, it was included in the National Register of Immovable Property Objects of the Material and Cultural Heritage of Uzbekistan - taken under state protection.

== History ==
The madrasa was built in 1909 by Khoja Abdulazizboy, who was one of the wealthy, generous, and learned people of Karshi. The madrasa is currently located in the "Old City" part of Qarshi city, in Odina garden.

== Architecture ==
The madrasa was built in accordance with the traditional style. The building has two floors and has a beautiful facade. The rooms on the first and second floors have different shapes. The entrance part has a high arch, which gives the building a solemnity. The sides of the arch are decorated with domes, which have ornamental patterns. The interior of the madrasa does not have such decorations. The bricks used for the building are also not uniform. The dome, which is located higher than the lower part of the building, is made of small-sized bricks. The arch and its sides are covered with bricks of different shapes. The building has a very thin wall. Although the old part of the madrasa does not have decorations, it has a special charm.

The dimensions of the madrasa are 26 meters in length and 24 meters in width. It has 27 rooms. Its courtyard is a 14-meter square, with a drain (sewer) in the middle, where the collected water flows. There is a staircase in the central arch that leads to the second floor. Currently, the regional "Khuarmand" association is located in the madrasa.

== See also ==
- Hofiz Qoʻngʻirot Madrasa
- Husayni Madrasa
- Bekmurodboy Madrasa

== Bibliography ==
- Poyon Ravshanov (2006). Qarshi tarixi (in Uzbek) (Yangi asr avlodi nashriyoti ed.). Tashkent. p. 647. ISBN 5-633-01899-0.
- Nasriddinov K, Xujayarov U (2011). Qarshi shahrining me'moriy yodgorliklari (in Uzbek) (Yangi asr avlodi ed.). Tashkent. p. 136. ISBN 978-9943-08-629-6.
