= Farjak Madrasa =

Madrasa in Bukhara, Uzbekistan

Farjak madrasa

General information
- Architectural style: Islamic
- Location: Bukhara, Uzbekistan
- Renovated: 12th century

The Farjak Madrasa was a madrasa located in Bukhara, Uzbekistan. The madrasa has not survived to the present day. It was one of the oldest madrasas in Bukhara, and it burned down in May–June 937 CE. The following information about the madrasa was given by Abu Bakr Muhammad an-Narshakhi: “Again, in the reign of Amir Sa’id Nasr ibn Ahmad ibn Ismail, in the three hundred and twenty-fifth year (937 CE), in the month of Rajab, a fire broke out in Bukhara and all the markets burned. The fire started from a shop of a woolen merchant. The shop was located at the Samarqand gate, and the woolen merchant had taken out a pot of wool and put it on a pit, where there was a hole, and he wanted to fill it up. There was a spark in the wool. The woolen merchant did not notice it and the wind carried the spark to a house made of reeds. The fire took the house and from it the fire spread to all the markets. The fire soared in the sky like a cloud. The “Koyi bikor” (Girls’ street), the bells of the markets, the Farjak madrasa, the team of the weavers, the market of the money-changers and the cloth merchants, and everything that was on that side of Bukhara to the river, burned”. The madrasa was later restored. The 12th-century author Abdukarim as-Sam’ani wrote that the madrasa was located in front of the Farjak gate. Farjak and Samarqand were two names of the same gate. Ibn al-Awfi, who lived in the 13th century, wrote in his work “Jawami’ al-hikaya” that he studied under the teacher Mas’ud Immomzoda at the Farjak madrasa. The madrasa was also active during the Mongol period. Farjak is one of the most ancient and first madrasas in Bukhara to this day. According to some researchers, this madrasa was the first madrasa in the Muslim world.

== See also ==
- Dor Ush-Shifo Madrasa
- Eshoni Pir Madrasa
- G‘oziyon Madrasa
