= Dor Ush-Shifo Madrasa =

Madrasa in Bukhara, Uzbekistan

The Dor Ush-Shifo Madrasa was a madrasa in Bukhara, Uzbekistan.

== Background ==
The madrasa does not exist today. Dor Ush-Shifo Madrasa was built in 1697 by Subhonqulixon, an Ashtarkhanid ruler of the Bukhara Khanate, in front of the Bukhara Registan. The madrasa was located near the Bukhara Ark.

The waqf document states that the madrasa was made of baked bricks. The madrasa had a dome and arches, a classroom for teaching medicine, an inner and outer courtyard, a summer mosque and a classroom. There was a street on the west side of the madrasa, a waqf land and a house of Hoji Baqo ibn Mulla Ibodulla on the north side, the Ark Fortress on the east side, and the Ark Canal on the south side. The madrasa was located in the Jilovxona Guzari area. Subhonqulixon endowed 3000 tanobs of land in Tahmiravon, 1000 tanobs of land in Shochmiyvan in Khutfar, and 2000 tanobs of land in Misgaron in Poyrud for the madrasa. Dor Ush-Shifo Madrasa also had a special library. Young children were mainly taught there. Subhonqulixon appointed Mulla G’afur as the trustee of the madrasa. Mulla G’afur was known as the “famous Turon physician” in the sources. Mulla Abdurahmon Tamkin Bukhoriy was a teacher at this madrasa until the Soviet revolution. A teacher with a yellow turban taught at Dor Ush-Shifo Madrasa. Mulla Abdurahim, Mulla Ahmadxoja and Mulla Shamsiddin were active as teachers at this madrasa. In addition, the waqf documents related to this madrasa contain information about the students. Sadri Ziyo wrote that there were 15 cells in this madrasa. Dor Ush-Shifo Madrasa consisted of 18 cells. The madrasa was built in the style of Central Asian architecture. The madrasa was made of baked bricks, wood, stone and plaster.

== See also ==
- Eshoni Pir Madrasa
- G‘oziyon Madrasa
- Farjak Madrasa
