= Eshoni Pir Madrasa =

Madrasa in Bukhara, Uzbekistan

Coordinates: 39°46′14″N 64°25′16″E

The Eshoni Pir Madrasa is a 2-storey madrasa building located in the historical center of Bukhara city, Bukhara region, Republic of Uzbekistan. It is included in the national register of immovable property objects of Uzbekistan’s material and cultural heritage.

== History ==
Eshoni pir madrasa was built in the middle of the 18th century by Ishoqhoja Dahbediy in Eshoni pir alley (Xojagi), during the reign of Muhammad Rahimbiy, the founder of the Manghit dynasty in Bukhara Emirate. Abdusattor Jumanazarov identified many waqf documents related to this madrasa. The copy of the waqf document was made during the reign of Amir Shohmurod. The waqf document states that the madrasa was built of baked bricks in Xojagi alley, with inner and outer courtyards, cells, and a mosque on the western side. Many shops and lands were endowed for this madrasa. For example, one butcher shop in Xoja Abdulloh Safedmo’y alley and 25 plots of land in Raboti Kuraviy cemetery in Komi Abu Muslim were endowed for the madrasa. The document was renewed and Ashurjon Qofilaboshi ibn Muhammad Rahimjon was appointed as the trustee for the madrasa. The madrasa expelled those who did not attend classes for more than 2 months and 10 days without a valid reason. This waqf document was copied in 1794-1795. Four waqf documents were found about the activities of the madrasa. Several teachers who worked at the madrasa were mentioned in the waqf documents. Among them, mulla Abdurahim, mulla Bobonazar, mulla Komilxoja were active. Sadri Ziyo wrote that there were 18 cells in this madrasa.

== Architecture ==
Eshoni pir madrasa consisted of 52 cells. This madrasa was built in the style of Central Asian architecture. The madrasa was made of baked bricks, wood, stone and gypsum.

== See also ==
- Dor Ush-Shifo Madrasa
- G‘oziyon Madrasa
- Farjak Madrasa
