= Hofiz Qoʻngʻirot Madrasa =

Madrasa in Bukhara, Uzbekistan

Hofiz Qoʻngʻirot madrasa

General information
- Architectural style: Central Asian
- Location: Hofiz Qoʻngʻirot alley, Bukhara
- Year built: 1910
- Opened: 1910
- Owner: Abdurahmon, son of Qozixon

Technical details
- Material: Baked brick, wood, stone and plaster
- Floor count: 1

The Hofiz Qoʻngʻirot Madrasa was a madrasa located in Bukhara, Uzbekistan. It no longer exists today. The Hofiz Qoʻngʻirot madrasa was established in 1910 by Abdurahmon, son of Qozixon, in the Hofiz Qoʻngʻirot alley, during the reign of Amir Abdulahad Khan of the Emirate of Bukhara. The researcher Abdusattor Jumanazarov studied several waqf documents related to this madrasa and provided information about it. The madrasa was bordered by a street on the west, the Poyi ostona hammam on the north, a pond courtyard on the east, and the mulla Muhammad Nazar mufti madrasa on the south. Before the madrasa, this place was vacant. The founder bought this place for 40,000 tangas and converted it into a madrasa. For the Hofiz Qoʻngʻirot madrasa, Abdurahmon, son of Qozixon, endowed 200 plots of land in the Choʻqmoq cemetery and 7 shops in the Navi oliy alley near the Soʻzangaron bazaar. The madrasa had rooms for two students each and a lecture hall. The madrasa waqf document was approved by the seal of sadr rais Mir Burhoniddin, son of qozi ul-quzzot Mir Badriddin. Three more waqf documents have been preserved about the activities of the Hofiz Qoʻngʻirot madrasa. In the late 19th century, mulla Imomiddin taught at this madrasa. The waqf document mentions the names of the madrasa students mulla Abduvahhob and Fathulloh. Sadri Ziyo wrote that the Hofiz Qoʻngʻirot madrasa had 8 rooms. The Hofiz Qoʻngʻirot madrasa burned down3. The Hofiz Qoʻngʻirot madrasa consisted of 21 rooms. The madrasa was built in the style of Central Asian architecture. The madrasa was made of baked brick, wood, stone and plaster.

== See also ==
- Husayni Madrasa
- Abdulazizkhoja Madrasa
- Bekmurodboy Madrasa
