= Husayni Madrasa =

Madrasa in Bukhara, Uzbekistan

Husayni madrasa
- Interactive map of the Husayni madrasa area

General information
- Architectural style: Islamic
- Location: Namozgoh Street, Bukhara, Uzbekistan
- Coordinates: 39°46′11″N 64°24′54″E
- Year built: 1884–1885

Technical details
- Material: Baked bricks
- Floor count: 1

The Husayni Madrasa (other names: Muhammad Yunusbiy madrasa, Muhammad Yunusbiy inoq madrasa) is a one-story madrasa building located in the historical center of Bukhara city, Bukhara region, Republic of Uzbekistan. It is included in the National Register of Immovable Cultural Heritage of Uzbekistan.

Despite the allocation of funds for the construction and renovation of the madrasa according to the state program of 2010, it has remained in need of repair until now.

== History ==
The madrasa was built in 1884–1885 in the Turki Jandiy alley of the capital of the Bukhara Emirate, during the reigns of Uzbek rulers Muzaffarxon (1860–1885) and Abdulahadxon (1885–1910), by a person named Muhammad Yunusbiy with his own funds.

Muhammad Yunusbiy was the governor of Chorjoʻy district and the inoq (tax collector).

After the establishment of the Soviet rule, the teaching of students in the madrasa was stopped.

According to the State Program developed in 2010, the madrasa was planned to be surveyed, structurally reinforced, built, restored and prepared for modern use in 2015, and 20 million sums were allocated for this purpose, but the building has remained in need of repair until now.

The madrasa building, as an architectural monument of Bukhara city, was included in the National Register of Immovable Cultural Heritage of Uzbekistan, approved in 2019.

It is located on Namozgoh Street, belonging to the Turki Jandiy MFY of Bukhara city.

== Architecture ==
The madrasa building is a one-story structure made of baked bricks. It consists of 14 rooms.

== See also ==
- Hofiz Qoʻngʻirot Madrasa
- Abdulazizkhoja Madrasa
- Bekmurodboy Madrasa
