= Odina Mosque =

Mosque in Qarshi, Uzbekistan

- Odina masjidi (Uzbek)
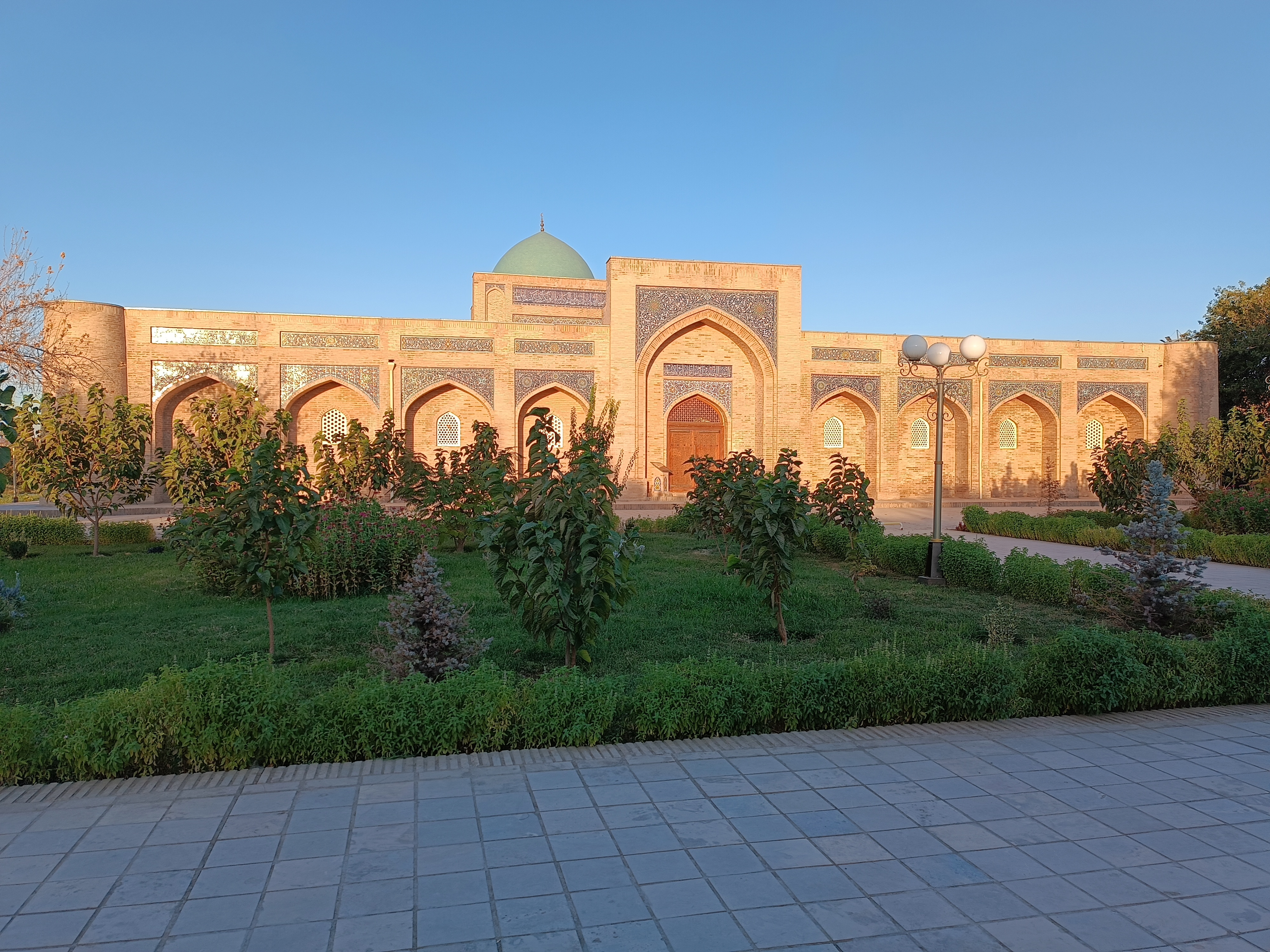
- Interactive map of Odina Mosque
- 38.867688°N 65.803166°E
- Location: Qarshi, Uzbekistan

History
- Founder: Timur
- Built for: Mosque
- Demolished: 1868

Odina Mosque (also known as Nasaf Katta Jome Mosque) is the oldest preserved architectural monument located in the city of Qarshi, Qashqadaryo region. The mosque is situated in the center of the Qarshi fortress. Timur, during his expedition from Samarkand to Qarshi in 1385-1386, ordered the construction of this mosque.

Presently, the mosque is located in the Odina district of the "Old City" in Qarshi. This historical monument has been included in the national list of non-residential objects of the material and cultural heritage of Uzbekistan, under the decree PQ-4068 of December 19, 2018, related to the comprehensive improvement of activities in preserving the objects of material and cultural heritage. According to the decree issued by the President of the Republic of Uzbekistan on October 8, 2020, a memorial museum dedicated to the victims of the Qataghan massacre in 2021 was established in the Odina Mosque.

== History ==
Historical scholars such as Boriboy Ahmedov and Mikhail Masson, in their works, associate the construction of this mosque with the name of Timur. After the 1860s, the Odina Mosque was dismantled, and its building materials were used for other purposes. The dome and remnants of the minarets were preserved until 1914. During the Soviet era, various offices were located in the Odina Mosque, and later it was even used as a warehouse. In 1938, the surroundings of the mosque were enclosed by a high wall, and it was converted into a house for detainees. One of the cells in this house for detainees accommodated nearly twenty people. In connection with the 2700th anniversary of the city of Qarshi, in 2004-2005, the house for detainees was moved beyond the city limits. The Odina Jome Mosque primarily served for Friday prayers, as well as prayers during Eid al-Fitr and Eid al-Adha, and the remaining (five daily) prayers were performed in local mosques.

== Architecture ==
The sides of the Odina mosque were built in the proportion of 50x40 meters. The places of worship inside the mosque are wide, and high, with a small dome on top, and thick brick columns are connected to each other through vaults. There is a large mihrab on the west side of the mosque. The prayer "Ayatal Kursi" from the Holy Quran is written in golden letters around the arch. There are seven marbles, on the right side of the mihrab, on which the sermon was read during the Friday and Eid prayers.

There is a small square in front of the Odina Mosque if seven steps were taken up from the Registan Square ("Kovush Partav" - the place where Kovush is taken off). Before the arrival of the tsarist invaders, there was a porch on the square, which was also destroyed by cannonballs. In 1914, during the renovation of the fortress by Said Olimkhan, this porch was also restored. It was not possible to restore the dome and minarets of the mosque, which were destroyed, during the renovation. The stone under the carved columns of the porch was made of marble, this place served as the entrance to the building. The porch was demolished after 1920, when the Bukhara Emirate was abolished, in the first year of the rule of the Shuras.

In 2021, 500 million sums(more than 40 thousand dollars) were allocated from the budget to improve the sewerage, ventilation, and drinking water supply of the Museum of Remembrance of the Victims of Revolt, which was established in the Odina Mosque, by the governor of Kashkadarya region.

== Names ==
The mosque is also known in historical sources as the "Nasaf Katta Jome Mosque" (Masjid Kalon). Among the people, it is commonly referred to as the Odina Mosque. Three endowment documents, written in 1924-1925, have been preserved for this mosque. In these endowment documents, the mosque is explicitly mentioned as the "Odina Mosque".

== Description ==
In historical sources, the Odina Mosque is referred to as a historical monument in Bukhara with the name "Kalan Mosque". The exterior dome of the mosque is tall, and the elegant dome is visible from a distance. Some speculate that the Masjid Kalon in Bukhara served as a model for the Odina Mosque. However, it is believed to be smaller in size, with its mihrab facing approximately 250° in the direction of the north pole.

== Gallery ==
Gallery

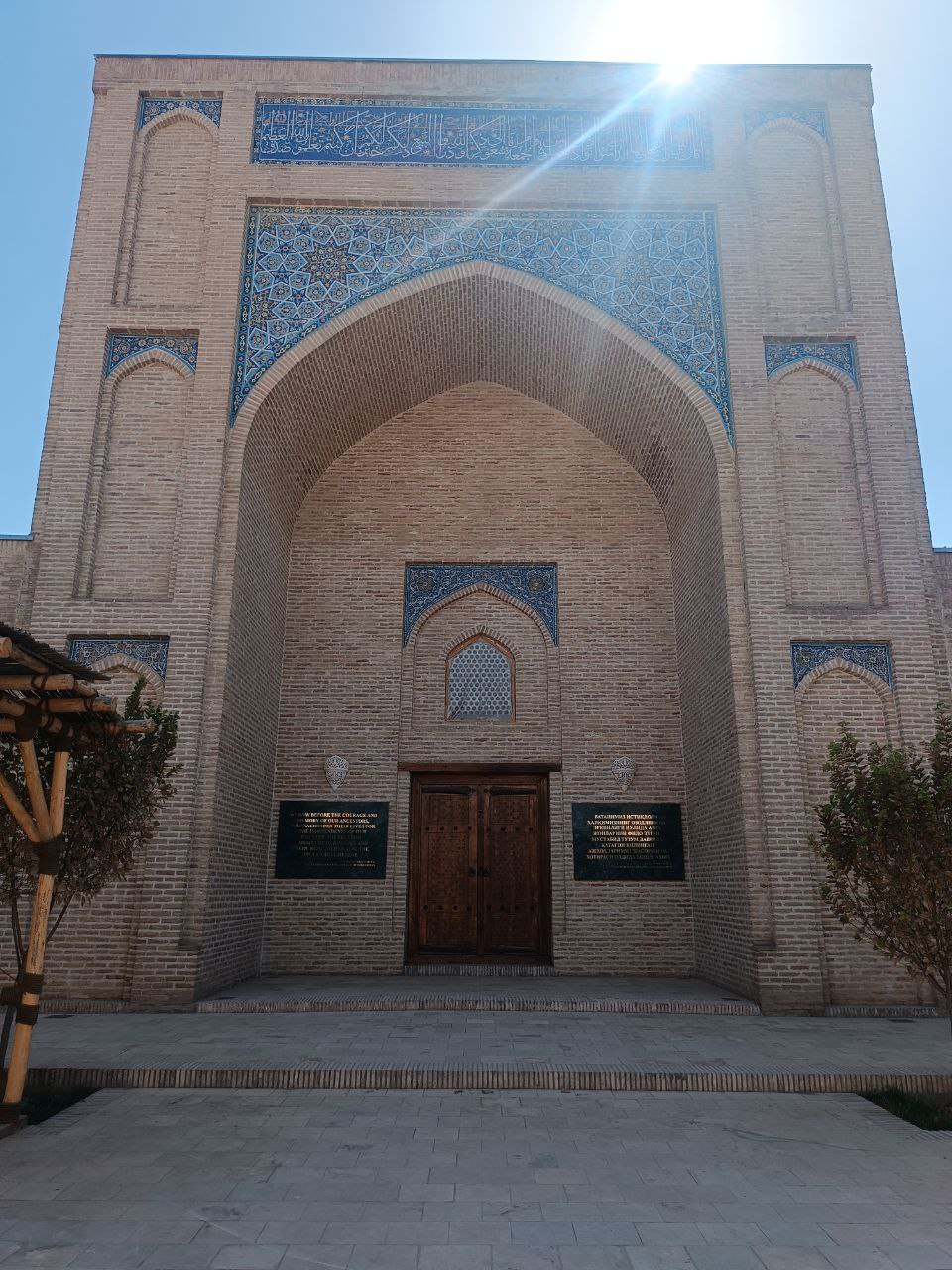
The main entrance of the Odina Mosque

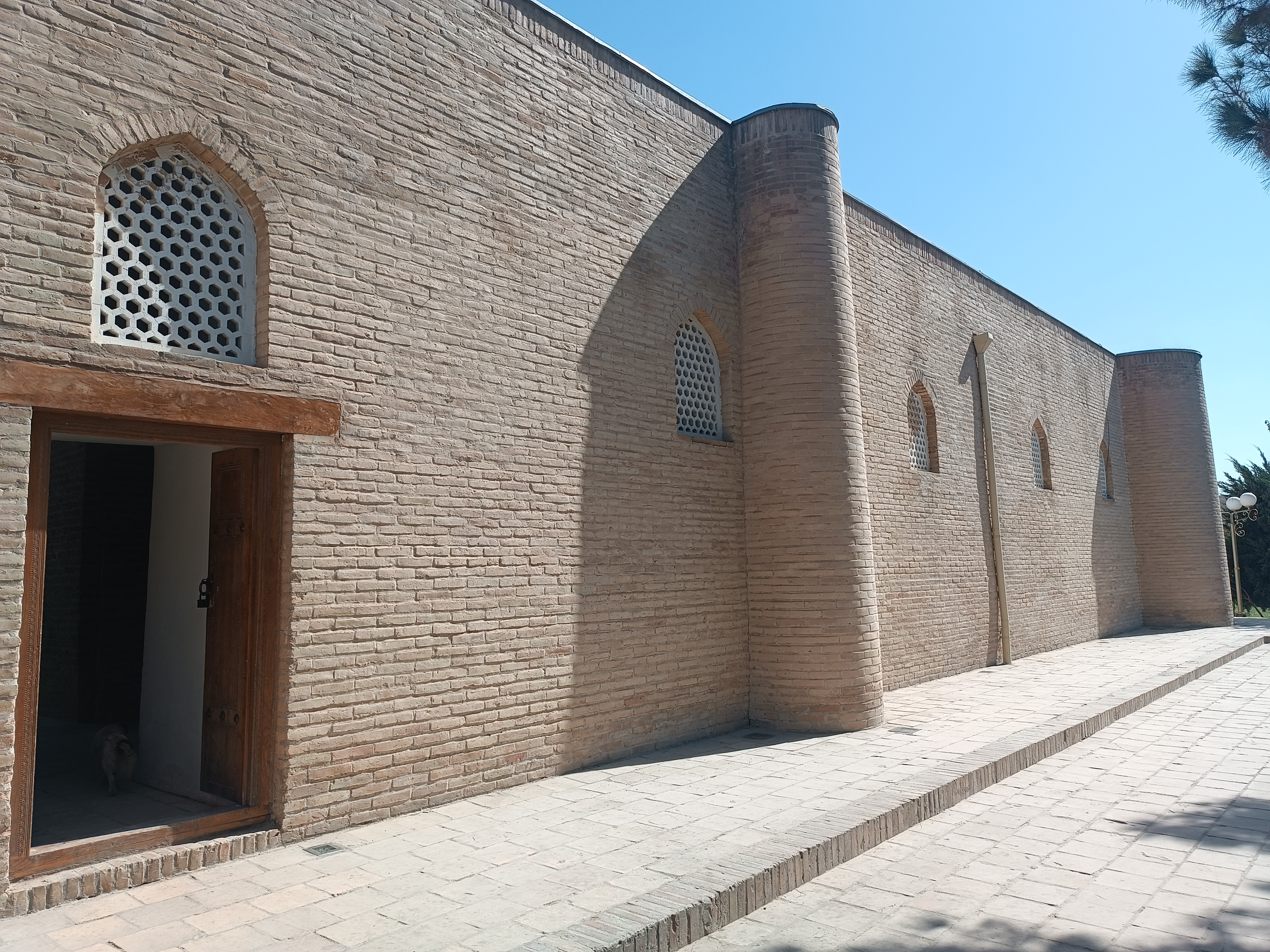
An additional entrance to the mosque

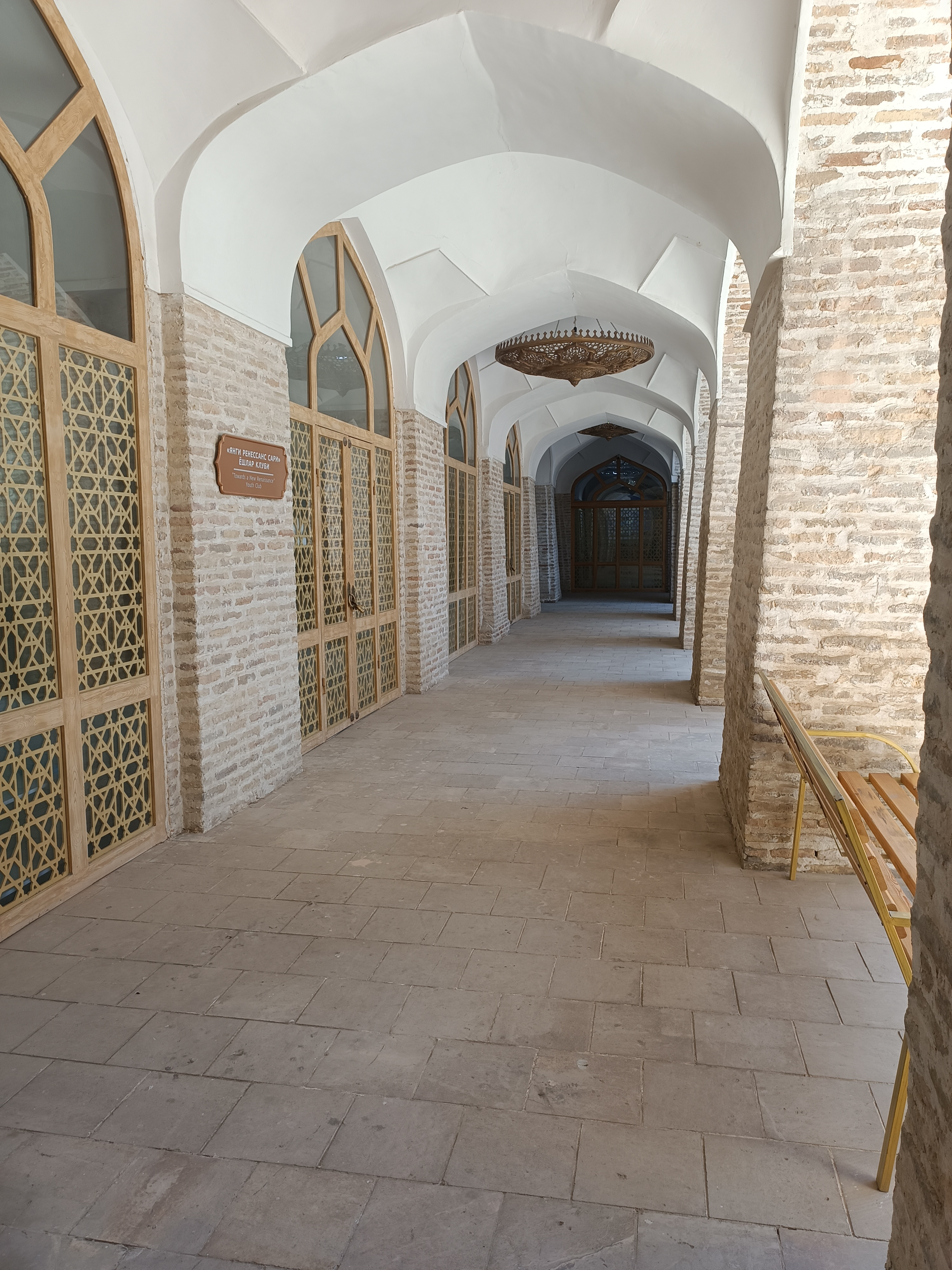
Hall part of the mosque

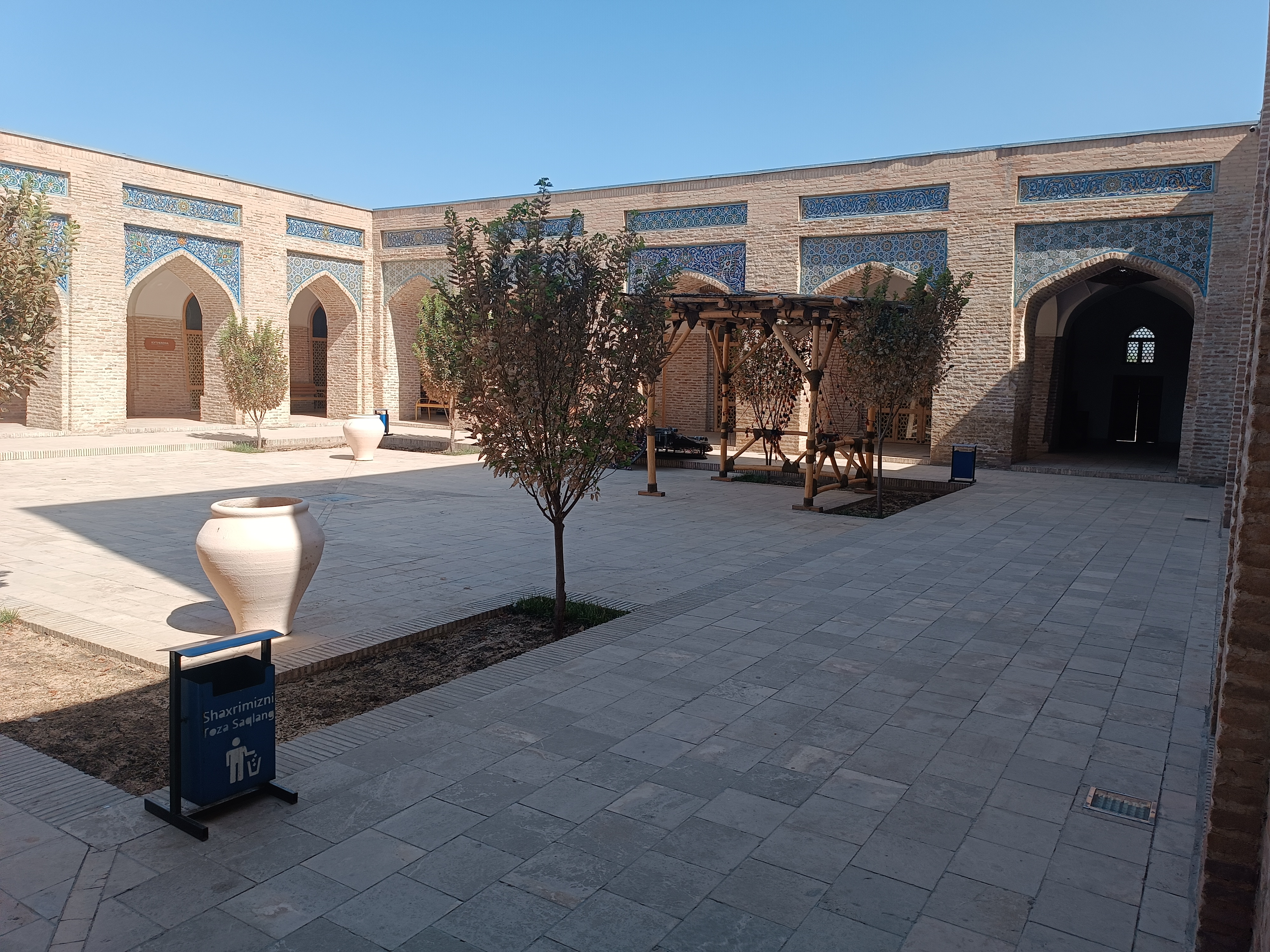
The courtyard of the mosque

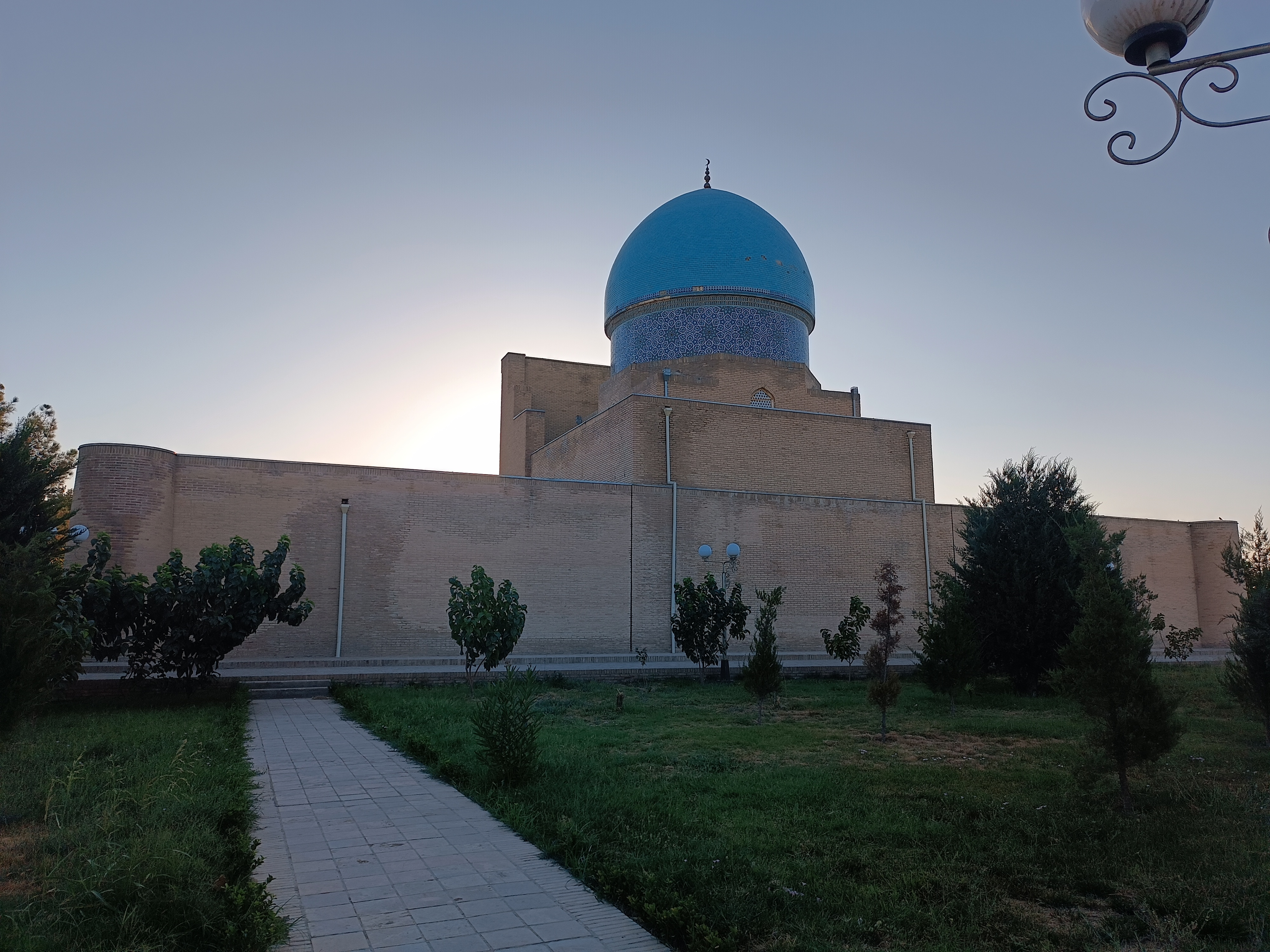
Rear view of Odina Mosque

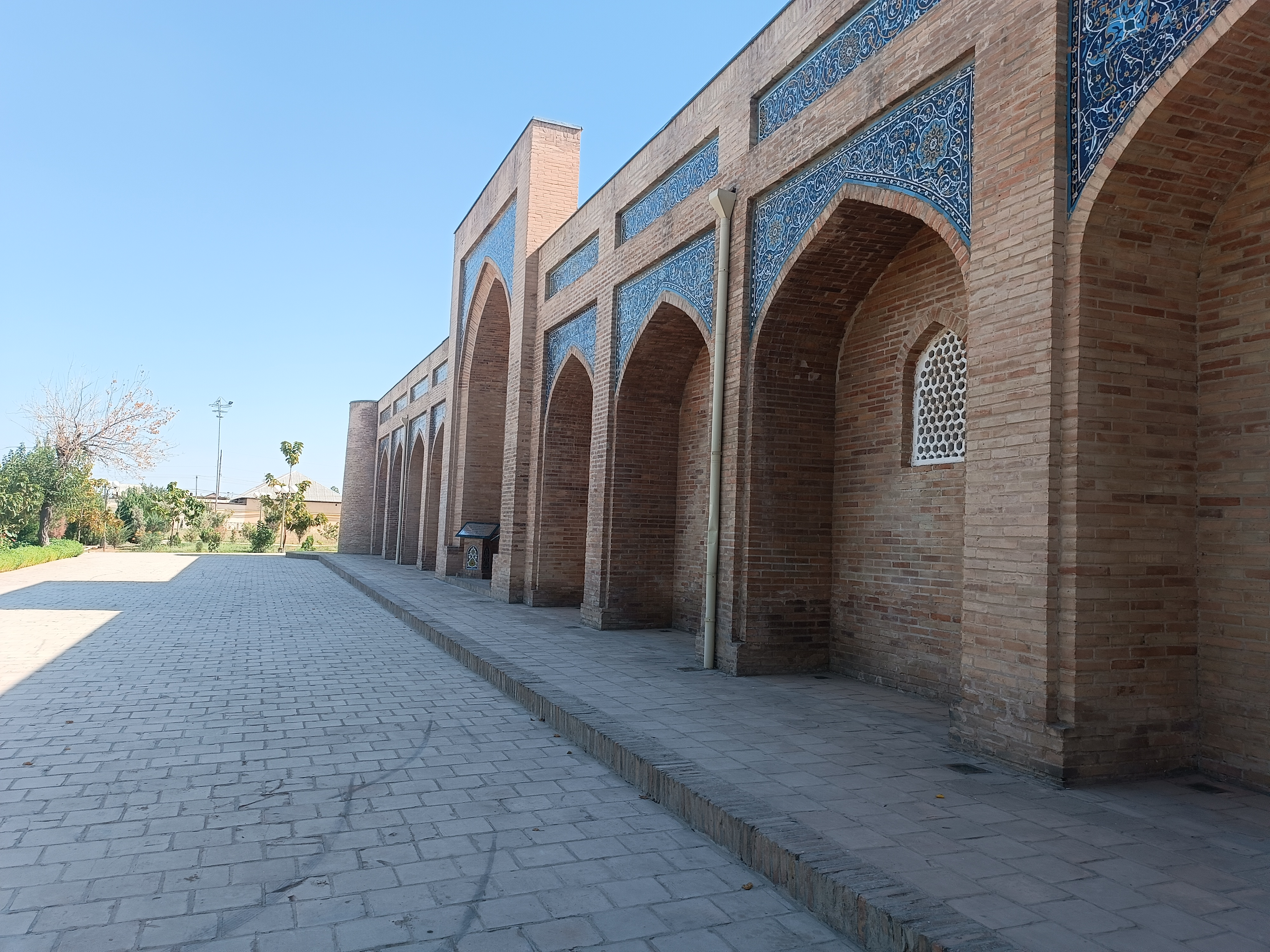
View of the entrance of the mosque from the northeast

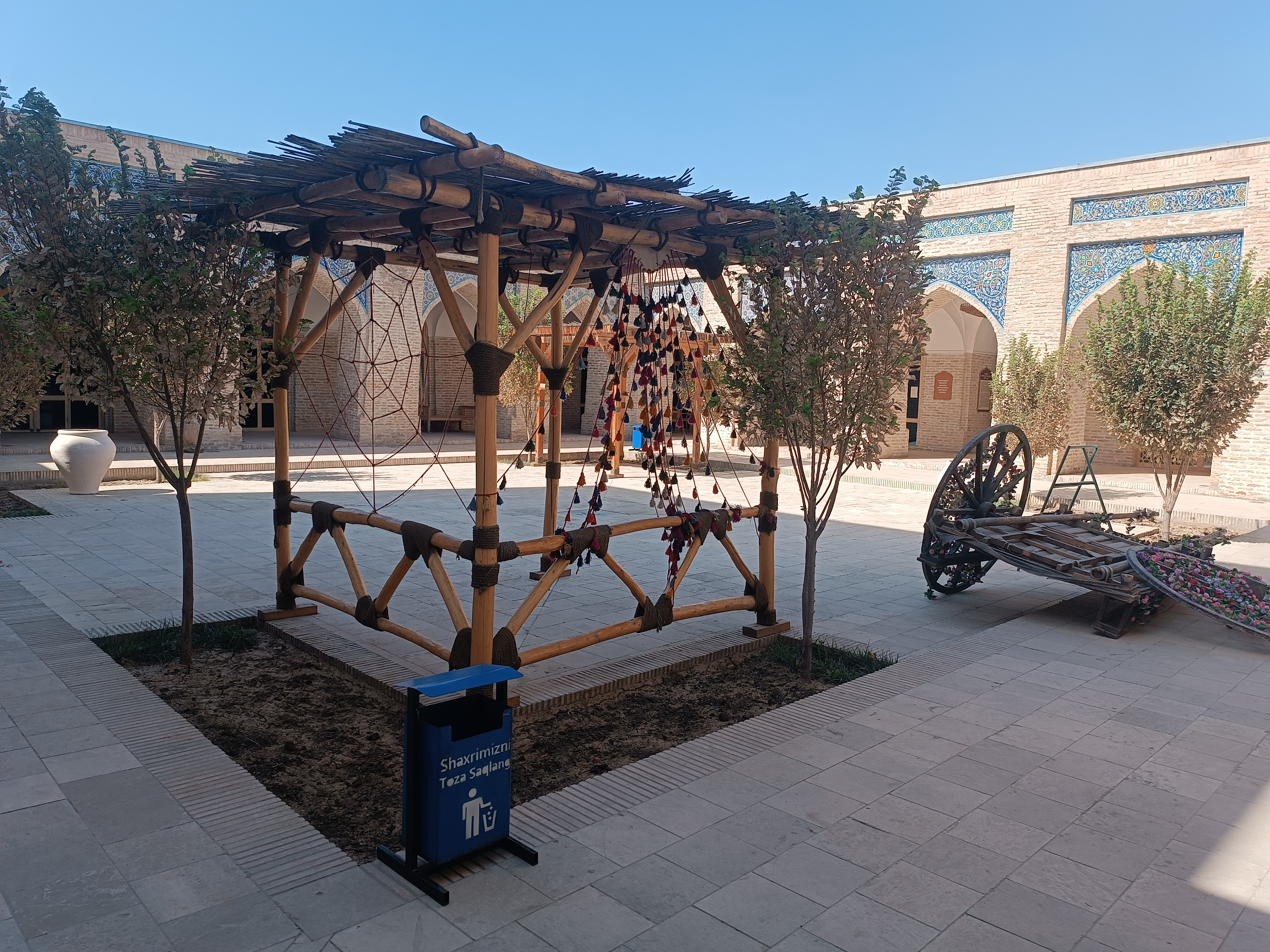
View of the courtyard of the mosque from the north-west side

== Literature ==
- Poyon Ravshanov. Qarshi tarixi. Toshkent: Yangi asr avlodi, 2006 - 647 pages. ISBN 5-633-01899-0.
- Nasriddinov K, Khujayarov U. Qarshi shahrining me′moriy yodgorliklari. Toshkent: Yangi asr avlodi, 2011 - 136 pages. ISBN 978-9943-08-629-6.
- Abdusattor Jumanazar. Nasaf. Publishing House of the National Library of Uzbekistan named after Alisher Navoi, 2007 - 204 pages. ISBN 978-9943-06-029-6.
