= Qarshi Bridge =

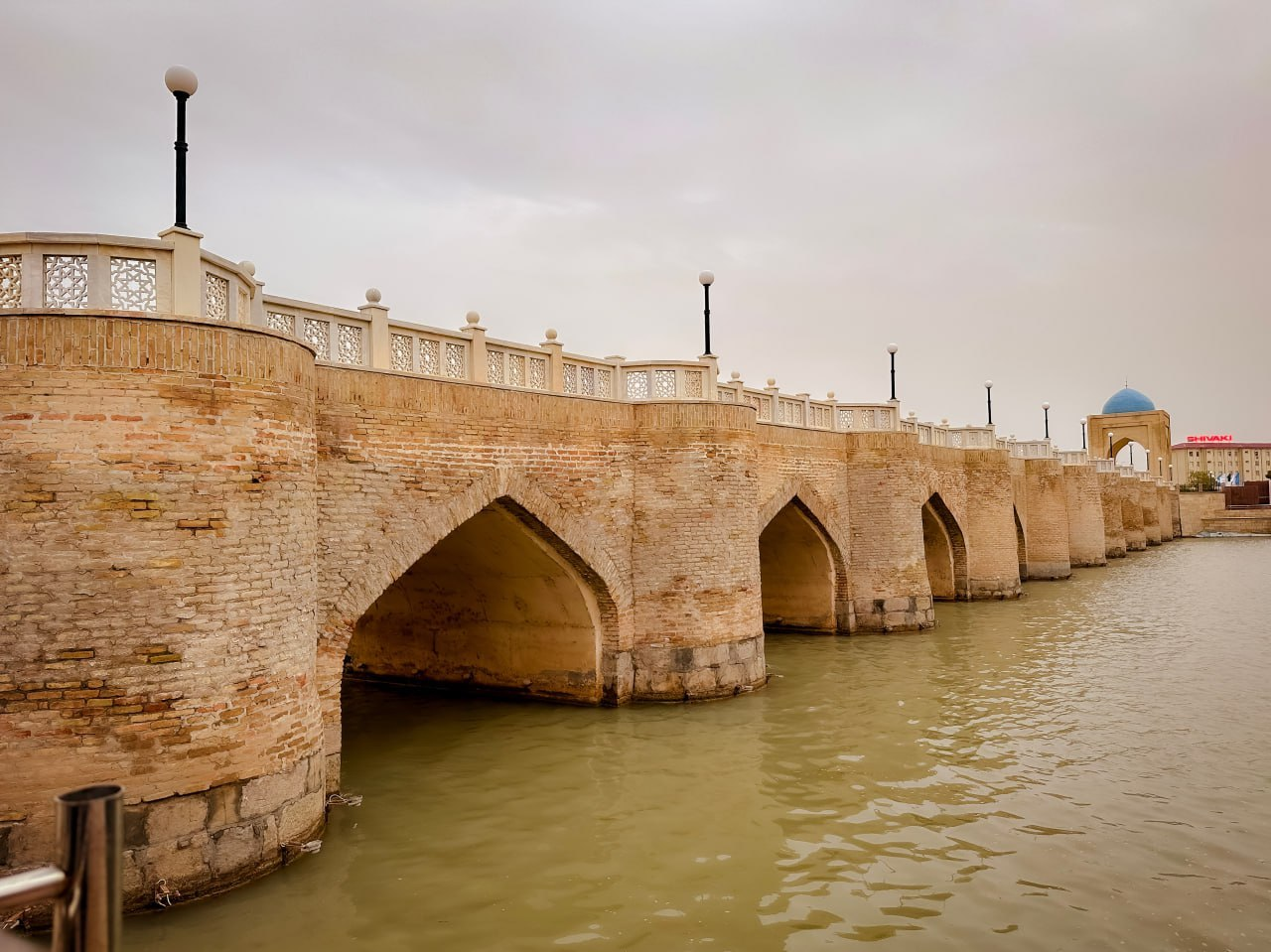
- Coordinates: 38.8867°N 65.8096°E
- Carries: Motor vehicles, pedestrians and bicycles
- Locale: Qarshi, Qashqadaryo Region, Uzbekistan
- Official name: Qashqadaryo Bridge
- Other name(s): Amir Temur Bridge, Shaibani bridge, Nikolaevsky bridge

Characteristics
- Design: Persian Architecture
- Total length: 122 m (400 ft)
- Width: 8.2 m (27 ft)
- Clearance below: 5.35 m (18 ft) at mid-span

History
- Construction start: 15th century
- Rebuilt: 1583, 1914, 2005, 2016

Location
- Interactive map of Qarshi Bridge

Qarshi Bridge (or Qashqadaryo Bridge) is an ancient brick bridge built over the Qashqadaryo River flowing through the territory of Qarshi city, connecting the two parts of the city. It is considered one of the symbols of the city of Qarshi. The construction of this bridge, which has reached so far, was carried out in the second half of the 16th century. Qarshi bridge is the largest bridge built over Qashqadaryo.

By the decision of the Cabinet of Ministers, it was included in the national list of real estate objects of tangible cultural heritage. The bridge was last repaired in 2016.

== Etymology ==
In the national list of real estate objects of tangible cultural heritage, the bridge is listed under the name of Qashqadaryo Bridge. Popularly and in some official sources, it is called Amir Temur Bridge, although it has no relation to Amir Temur. The bridge has several other names besides Qarshi Bridge. In particular, it was popularly known by such names as Shaibani bridge and Nikolaevsky bridge, and these names are also mentioned in historical sources.

== History ==
The construction of this bridge began many centuries ago. It is recorded that the bridge was crossed for the first time in the 15th century. In 1583, a new bridge was built in the style of Persian architecture. While it was possible to cross the old bridge only on foot, the bridge built by Abdullah Khan II was made possible to cross on horses and horse-carts. The main initiator of the construction of the bridge was the Shayban ruler Abdullah Khan II. He developed the city, took care of its inhabitants, and most importantly, wanted to turn Qarshi into an important trade center. During the reign of Abdullah Khan II, one of the largest bridges in Asia was built in Qarshi. The length of the bridge is 122 meters, the width is 8.2 meters, the height above the water is more than five meters. The bridge is supported by ten connecting arches. The total height of the river to its middle covers is 5.35 meters. On both sides of the bridge, staircases were built. Its base expands as it descends. As a result, it merges with the constellations, each of which has a radius of two meters.

At that time, this building became the main stopover area of Qarshi merchants. Because of this, the Qarshi bridge later became a symbol of the city. In the Middle Ages, this bridge facilitated the movement of important caravan routes connecting Iran and India with many European countries through Nasaf (Qarshi).

According to German Vambery, a scientist and tourist, in the 1860s, there were ten hostel, a large market, and a park where residents of the city could relax. He noted that he had not seen such a park in other countries.

== Architecture ==
The bridge construction materials, which are considered to be among the ancient structures of Central Asia, mainly consisted of aerated bricks and reinforcing compounds. A total of 12 piers and 14 arches were visible on the bridge. Over time, the river bed expands, and the bridge needs to be extended and repaired. Due to this, in 1914, the bridge was renovated, additional parts were built on both sides of it, and two guardhouses made of adobe bricks were built at the entrance. Also, the ancient piers on the edge of the coast were renovated. In this regard, there are inscriptions written on the brick slabs there. They were demolished in 1970 because they interfered with freight traffic, but were rebuilt in 2005.

In 2016, on the initiative of Islam Karimov, the historical bridge was renovated and its surroundings turned into a recreation area. A small alley was built here. Along the banks of the river, a café-bar, a cottage, a sports field with an artificial surface and a children's playground were built.
