= Qarshi =

City in southern Uzbekistan

Qarshi Karshi, Карши
- City
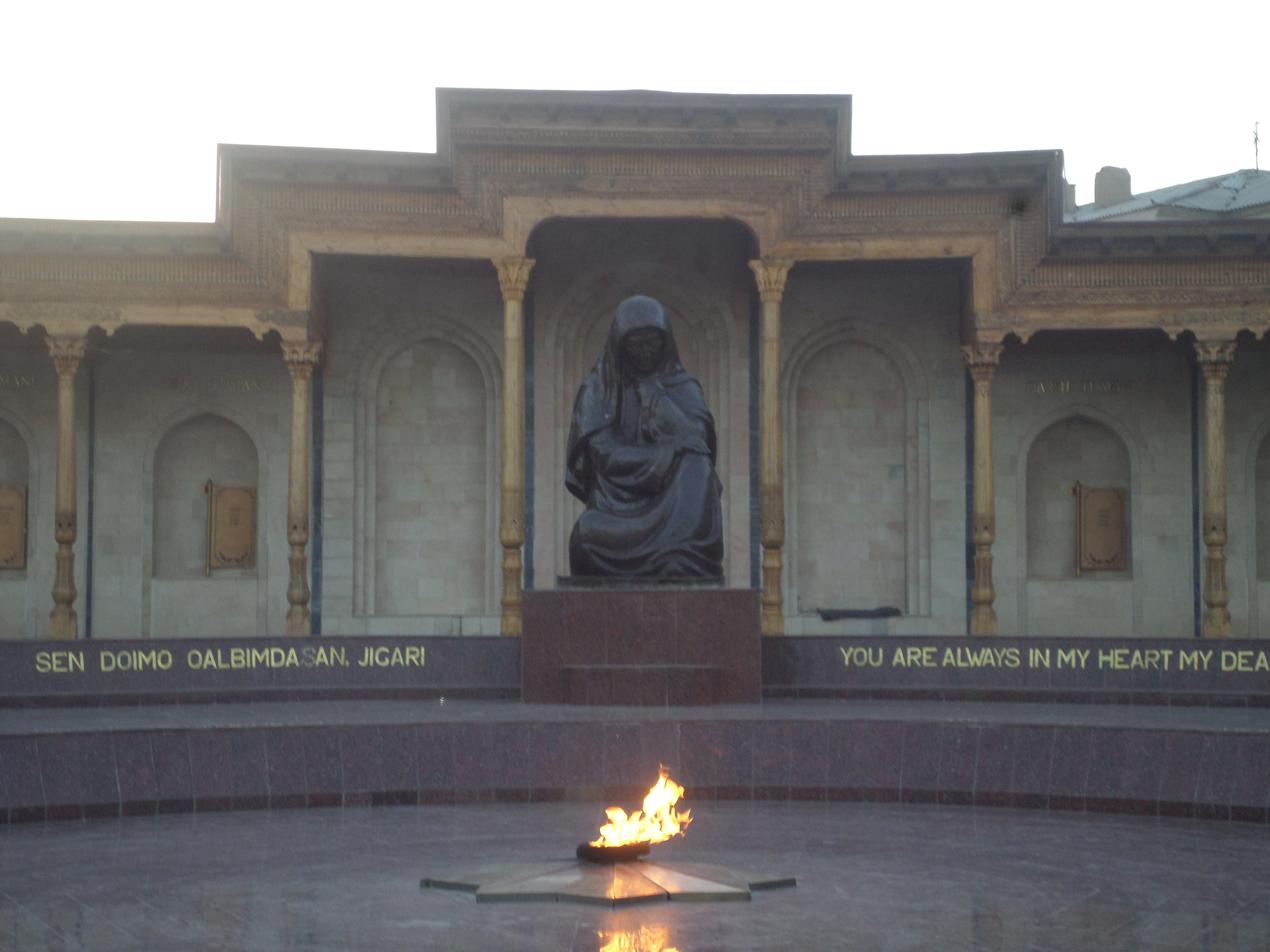
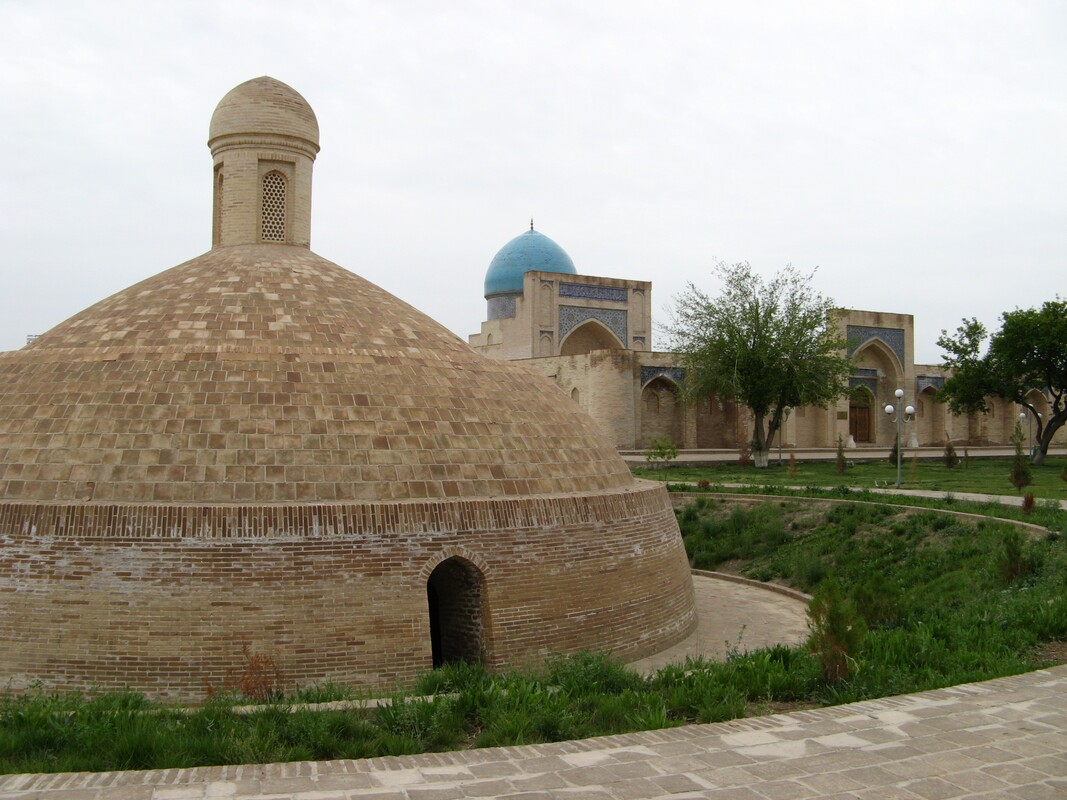
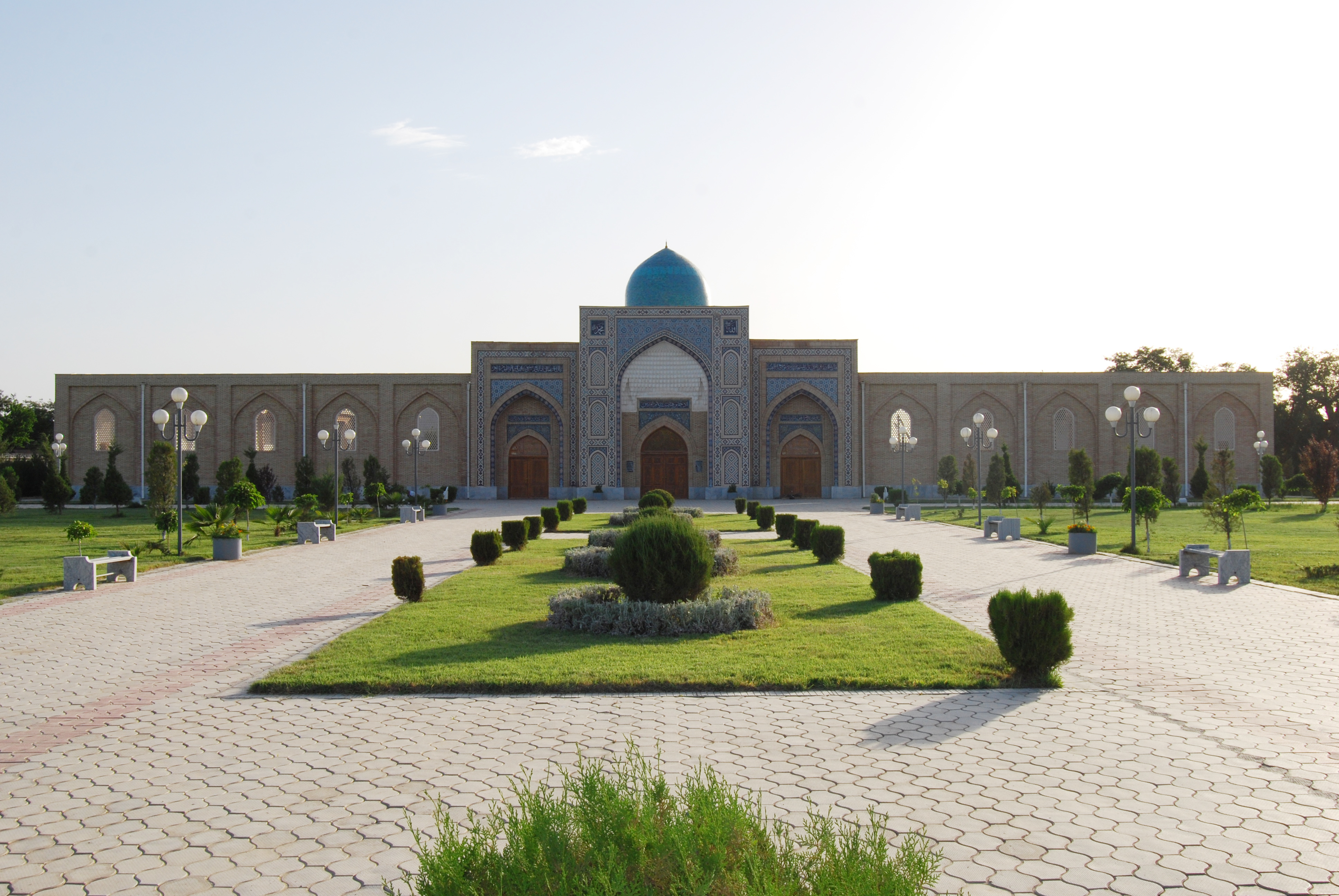
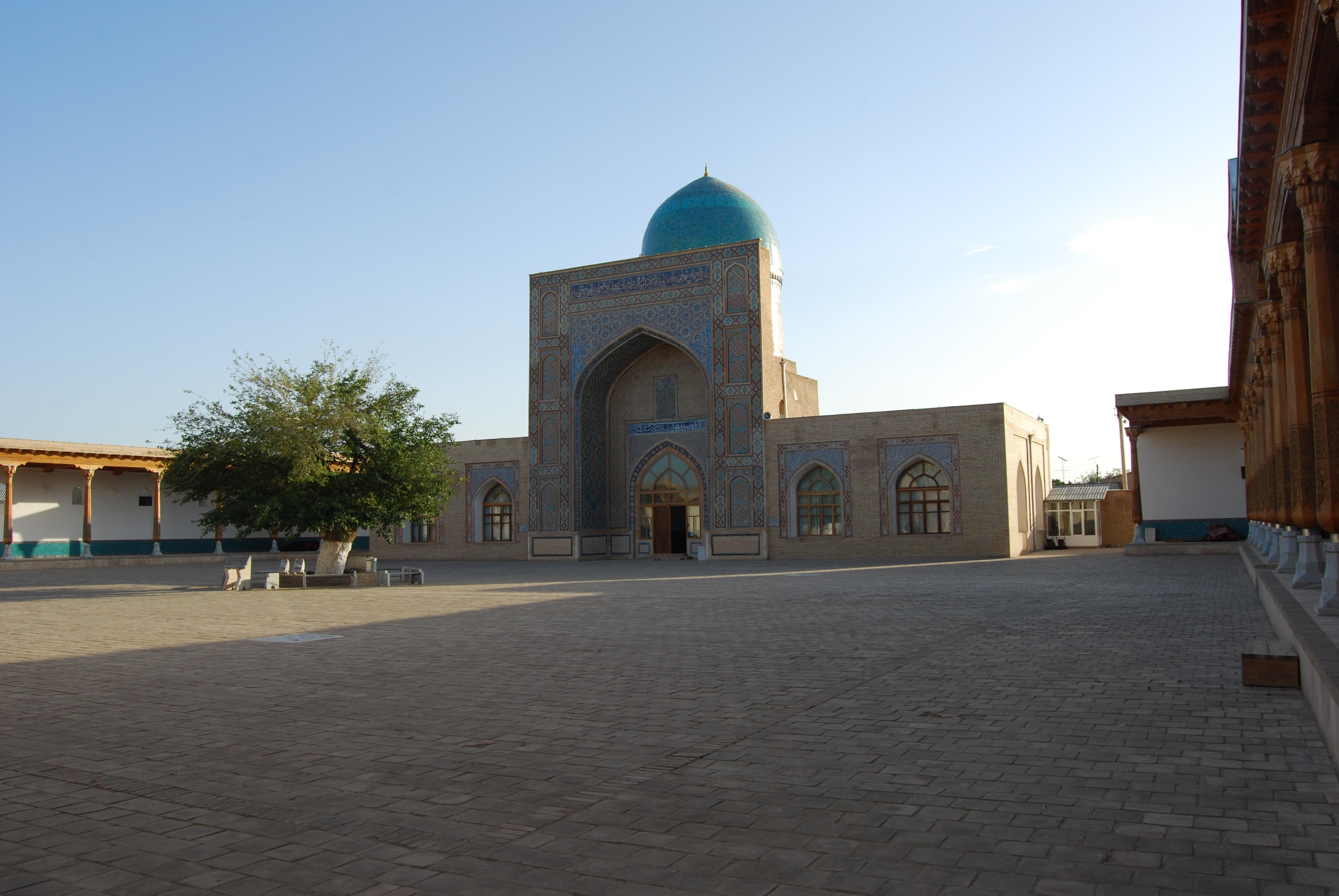
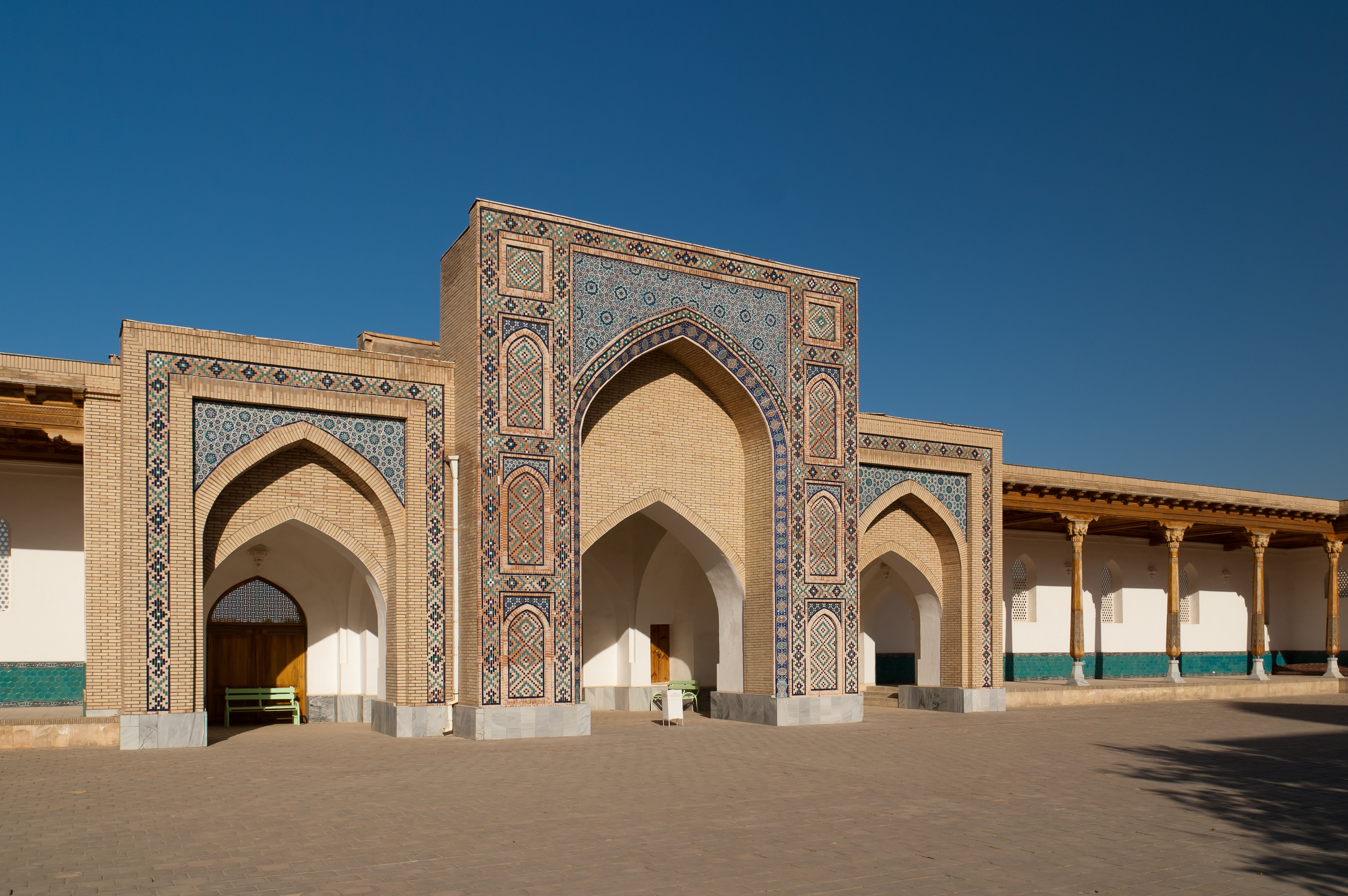
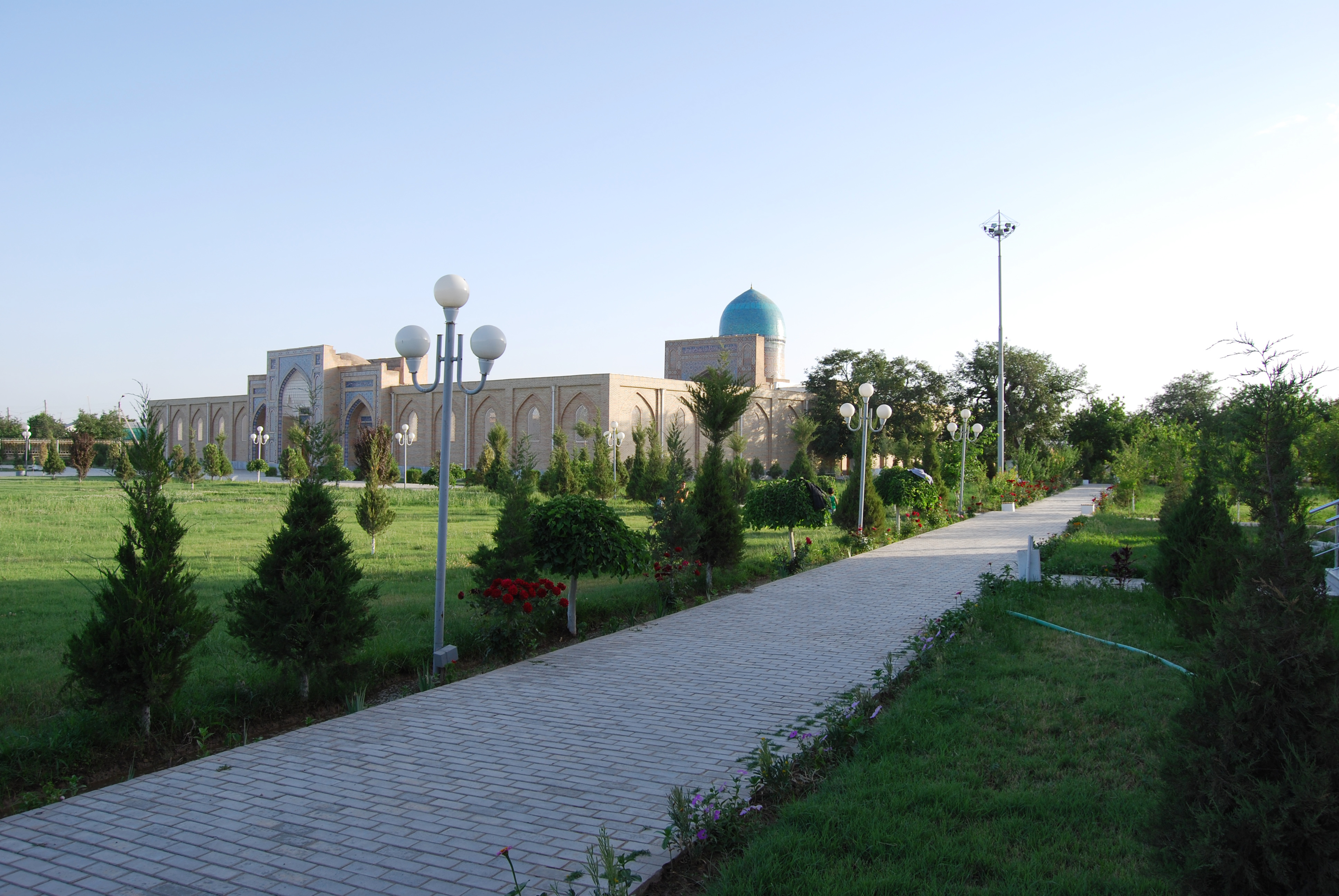

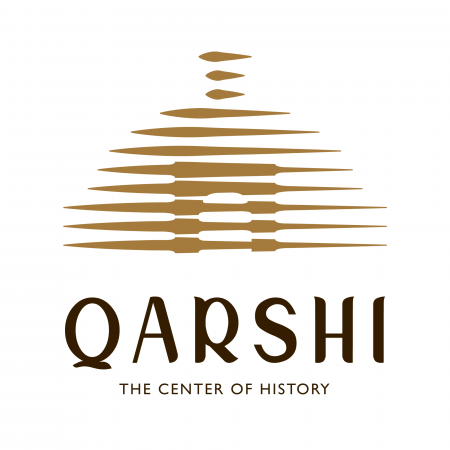
- Brandmark

- Location in Uzbekistan
- Coordinates: 38°51′40″N 65°47′05″E
- Country: Uzbekistan
- Region: Qashqadaryo Region
- Inception: 1926

Area
  - Total: 75.92 km^{2} (29.31 sq mi)
- Elevation: 374 m (1,227 ft)

Population (2021)
  - Total: 278,300
  - Density: 3,666/km^{2} (9,494/sq mi)
- Time zone: UTC+05:00 (UZT)
- Area code: (+998) 75

Qarshi (/kɑːrˈʃiː/ kar-SHEE; Uzbek: Қарши, Uzbek pronunciation: [qarˈʃɨ]) is a city in southern Uzbekistan. It is the capital of Qashqadaryo Region. Administratively, Qarshi is a district-level city, that includes the urban-type settlement Qashqadaryo. It has a population of 278,300 (2021 estimate). It is about 520 km south-southwest of Tashkent, and about 335 km north of Uzbekistan's border with Afghanistan. The city is important in natural gas production, but Qarshi is also famous for its production of woven flat carpets.

== History ==
Originally the Sogdian city of Nakhshab (which could be possibly named Eucratideia during the rule of Greco-Bactrian Kingdom), and the Islamic Uzbek (Turkic) city of Nasaf, and the Chagatay city of Qarshi (pronounced Kharsh), Qarshi was the second city of the Emirate of Bukhara. It is in the center of a fertile oasis that produces wheat, cotton, and silk and was a stop on the 11-day caravan route between Balkh and Bukhara. The Mongol Chagataid khans Kebek and Qazan built palaces here on the site of Chinggis Khaan's summer pasture. In 1364, Timur also built a fortified palace with moats in what is now the southern part of the city. The modern name "Qarshi" means fort.

Qarshi developed steadily from the 14th century. During the Sheyban dynasty the town grew violently (16th century). It was the second largest town of Bukhara Khanate in the 18th century. During these centuries much of the city's magnificent architectural monuments were built. With the decline of Shahrisabz in the 18th century, Qarshi grew in importance, and was the seat of the Crown Prince to the Emirate of Bukhara. The city had a double set of walls, 10 caravanserais and 4 madrassahs during this time. By 1868, the Russians had annexed the Zarafshan Valley, and in 1873, the treaty turning Bukhara into a Russian protectorate was signed in Qarshi, much to the dismay of the Emir's son, Abdul Malik, who took to the hills in rebellion.

In the early 1970s, the first section of a major irrigation project was completed to divert water from the Amu Darya River in Turkmenistan eastward into Uzbekistan in order to irrigate the land surrounding Qarshi. Almost all of these irrigated lands around Qarshi are planted with cotton.

== Main sites ==
=== Odina Mosque ===
- Odina Mosque was built in the 16th century and is on the southeast side of Qarshi's Eski Bazaar. The mosque was built on the site of an older Mongol palace, which had also been used as a prison. The mosque has an attractive domed exterior, and also a sardoba, a domed reservoir which stopped the water supply becoming contaminated or evaporating. It is no longer used for worship but instead houses Qarshi's Regional Museum.

=== Madrassas ===
- There are three madrassas in Qarshi, all on the same square. These are the Kalizbek, Bakmir, and Khodjaev Abdul Aziz Madrasas, which were all built between 1904 and 1915. The madrassas no longer have a religious function and are in need of reservation, but tourists can enter inside if they ask the guardian.
- Rabiya Madrassah – a late 19th-century female madrassah

=== Kok Gumbaz Mosque ===
- Kok Gumbaz (which means "blue dome") is Qarshi's Friday Mosque. It is the largest such mosque in the region, and was constructed by Emperor Ulugbek on behalf of his father, Shah Rukh, in the late 16th century. Kok Gumbaz is architecturally quite similar to other Timurid mosques, including in Shakhrisabz, but it has been less heavily restored, so more of the original features remain intact.

=== Qarshi Bridge ===
- Qarshi Bridge is an ancient brick bridge built over the Qashqadaryo River, constructed in the second half of the 16th century.

=== World War II Memorial ===
- Qarshi's war memorial to casualties of the Great Patriotic War is one of the largest Soviet era memorials in Central Asia. It is a mix of walkways, plaques, an eternal flame, and a red star-topped tower with a series of stained-glass windows. It is possible to access the upper levels of the memorial on request.

== Climate ==
Köppen climate classification system classifies its climate as cold semi-arid (BSk).

Climate data for Qarshi (1991–2020)
Month	Jan	Feb	Mar	Apr	May	Jun	Jul	Aug	Sep	Oct	Nov	Dec	Year
Mean daily maximum °C (°F)	9.1 (48.4)	11.9 (53.4)	17.9 (64.2)	24.6 (76.3)	31.3 (88.3)	36.7 (98.1)	38.4 (101.1)	36.6 (97.9)	31.4 (88.5)	24.5 (76.1)	16.3 (61.3)	10.5 (50.9)	24.1 (75.4)
Daily mean °C (°F)	3.4 (38.1)	5.6 (42.1)	11.2 (52.2)	17.4 (63.3)	23.6 (74.5)	28.8 (83.8)	30.5 (86.9)	28.1 (82.6)	22.4 (72.3)	15.8 (60.4)	9.2 (48.6)	4.5 (40.1)	16.7 (62.1)
Mean daily minimum °C (°F)	−0.6 (30.9)	1.0 (33.8)	5.9 (42.6)	11.3 (52.3)	16.4 (61.5)	20.6 (69.1)	22.4 (72.3)	19.9 (67.8)	14.4 (57.9)	8.6 (47.5)	3.8 (38.8)	0.5 (32.9)	10.4 (50.7)
Average precipitation mm (inches)	35.7 (1.41)	42.1 (1.66)	46.5 (1.83)	34.8 (1.37)	18.8 (0.74)	1.6 (0.06)	0.6 (0.02)	0.2 (0.01)	1.1 (0.04)	4.7 (0.19)	24.4 (0.96)	27.2 (1.07)	237.7 (9.36)
Average precipitation days (≥ 1.0 mm)	11	11	12	9	7	2	1	0	1	4	8	10	76
Average relative humidity (%)	79	74	72	64	48	33	30	33	38	48	62	78	66
Source 1: NOAA
Source 2: Deutscher Wetterdienst (humidity)

== Industry ==
A gas-to-liquids (GTL) plant, located 40 km south of Qarshi, is under construction. This plant will be based on Sasol’s GTL technology and will have a capacity of 1.4 million metric tons per year, with following product slate: GTL diesel, kerosene, naphtha and liquid petroleum gas. The total cost of the project is around $4 billion and it is the first such a high-tech plant on the Eurasian continent. The joint project GTL Uzbekistan, where Sasol and Uzbekistan's state oil company Uzbekneftgas each hold 44.5% interest, and the rest 11% belonging to Malaysian Petronas, was founded in 2009. The plant will be built on the basis of the Shurtan gas and chemical complex.

== Culture ==
=== Sports ===
Qarshi is home to FC Nasaf which was founded in 1986. Nasaf plays its home matches at the Markaziy Stadium, built in 2006.

== Education ==
- One university and one institution of higher learning:
  - Karshi State University
  - Karshi engineering-economics institute
  - Karshi branch of Tashkent University of Information Technologies

== Local infrastructure ==
=== Transportation ===
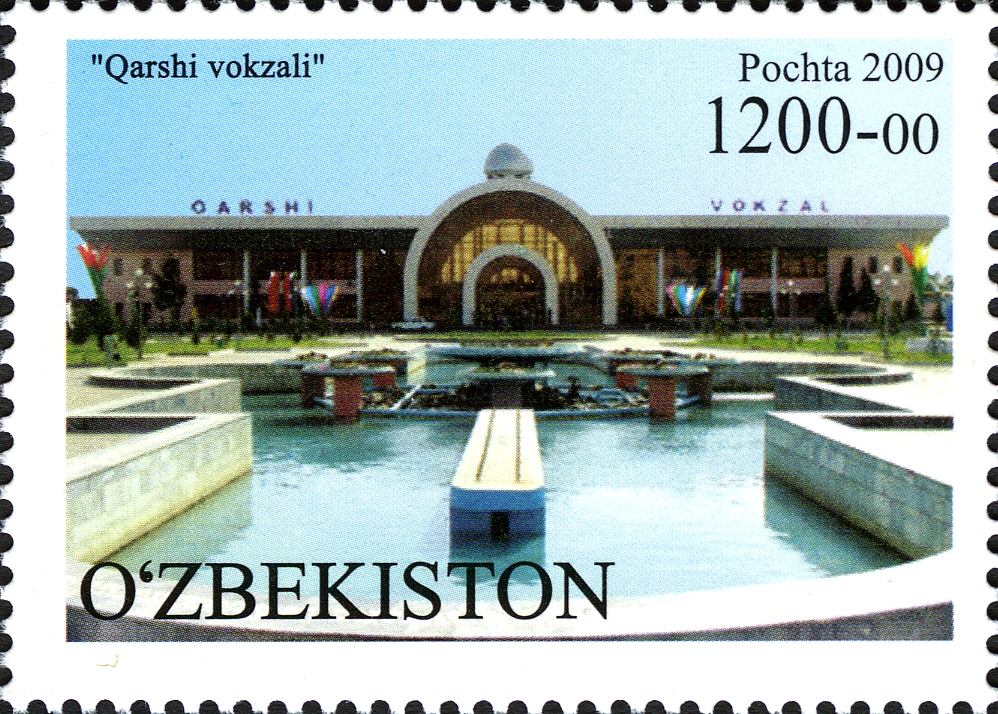
Qarshi railway station

- Qarshi is served by Qarshi Airport with flights to Tashkent, Navoi and some major Russian cities.

=== Landmarks ===
- Khoja Abdul Aziz Madrassah – largest in town, now housing the Regional Museum
- Rabiya Madrassah – a late 19th-century female madrassah
- Kok Gumbaz Mosque – part of a 16th-century complex of buildings
- World War II Memorial – Perhaps one of the ex-Soviet Union's most monumental monuments

== Notable people ==
- Muhammad ibn Ahmad al-Nasafi (d. 943 CE), Isma'ili missionary and theologian
- Abu al-Mu'in al-Nasafi (d. 508 AH/1114 CE).
- Abu Hafs Umar an-Nasafi was a Muslim jurist, theologian, mufassir, muhaddith and historian. A Persian scholar born in Transoxiana, he wrote mostly in Arabic.
- Abu al-Barakat al-Nasafi (d. 710 AH/1310 CE).
- Poyon Ravshan (1941-2021) – uzbek historian

== Bibliography ==
- Grousset, René (1970). The Empire of the Steppes: A History of Central Asia. Translated by Walford, Naomi. New Brunswick: Rutgers University Press. ISBN 978-0-8135-0627-2. SBN 8135-1304-9.
