= Qashqadaryo (river) =

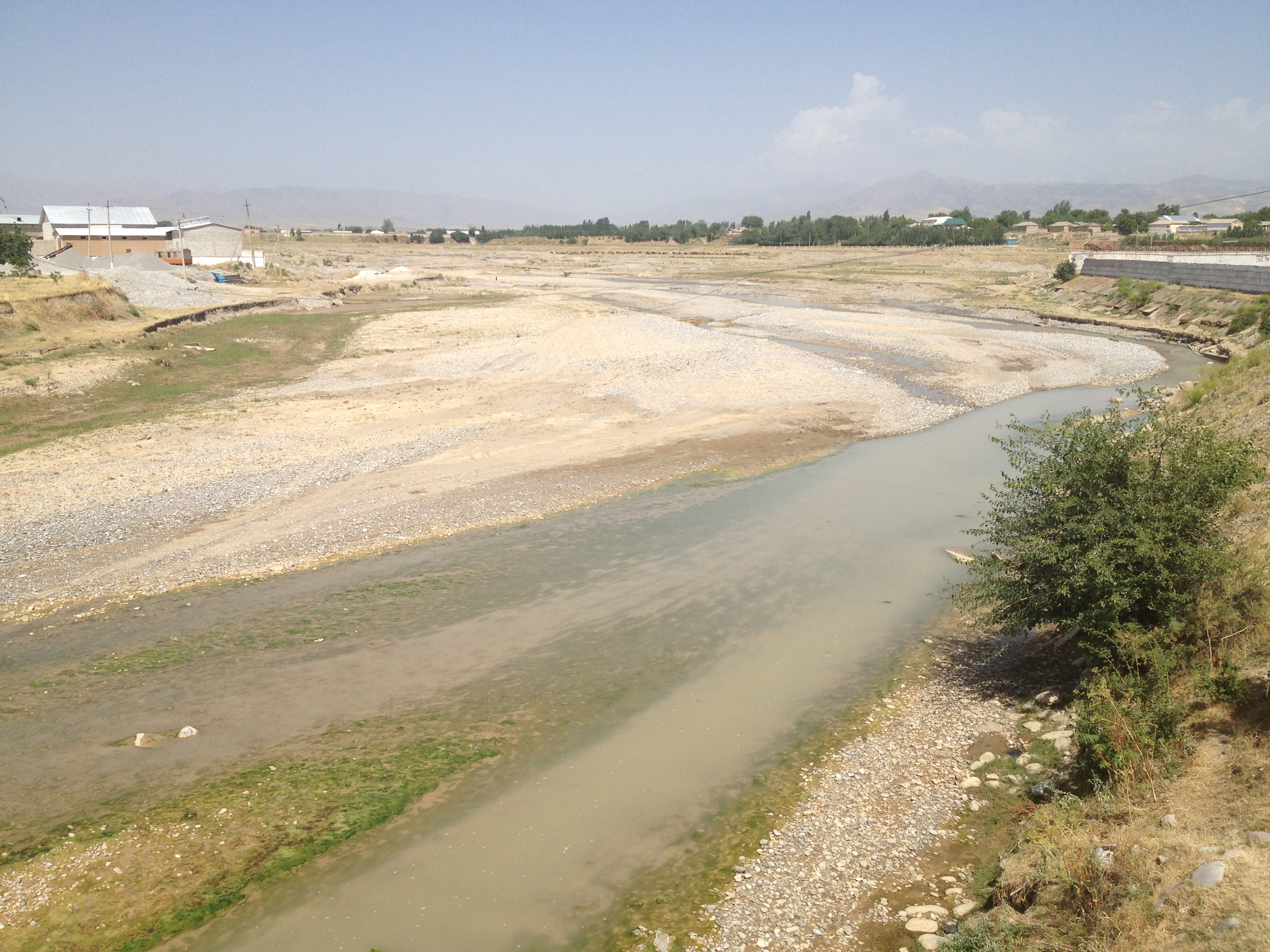
- The Qashqadaryo in Kitab town

Location
- Country: Uzbekistan

Physical characteristics
- Mouth: Qarshi Steppe
  - coordinates: 39.352°N 64.9824°E
- Length: 378 km (235 mi)
- Basin size: 8,780 km^{2} (3,390 sq mi)

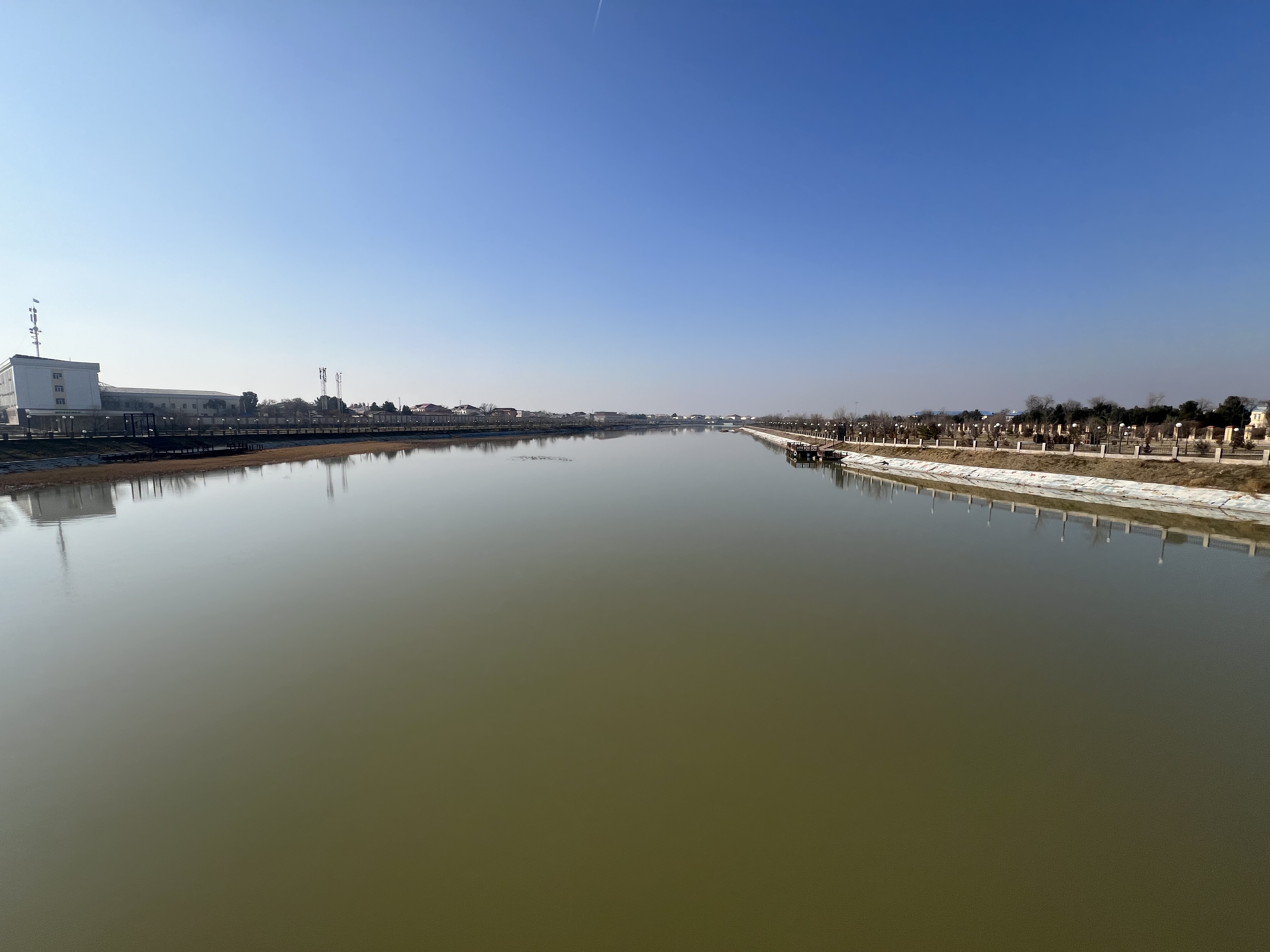
View from Karshi historical bridge

The Qashqadaryo (Uzbek: Qashqadaryo) or Kashkadarya (Russian: Кашкадарья) is a river in southern Uzbekistan. The river is 378 kilometres (235 mi) long and has a basin area of 8,780 square kilometres (3,390 mi^{2}). It disappears in the Qarshi Steppe.

By the river is the city of Qarshi, the capital of the Qashqadaryo Region, which lies within the basin of the river.

The river takes some water from Zeravshan River via the Eskianhor (Эскианхор) canal and forms the Chimkurgan reservoir.

== See also ==
- Qarshi Bridge
