= Bekmir Madrasa =

Historical monument in Uzbekistan

Coordinates: 38°52′07″N 65°48′10″E

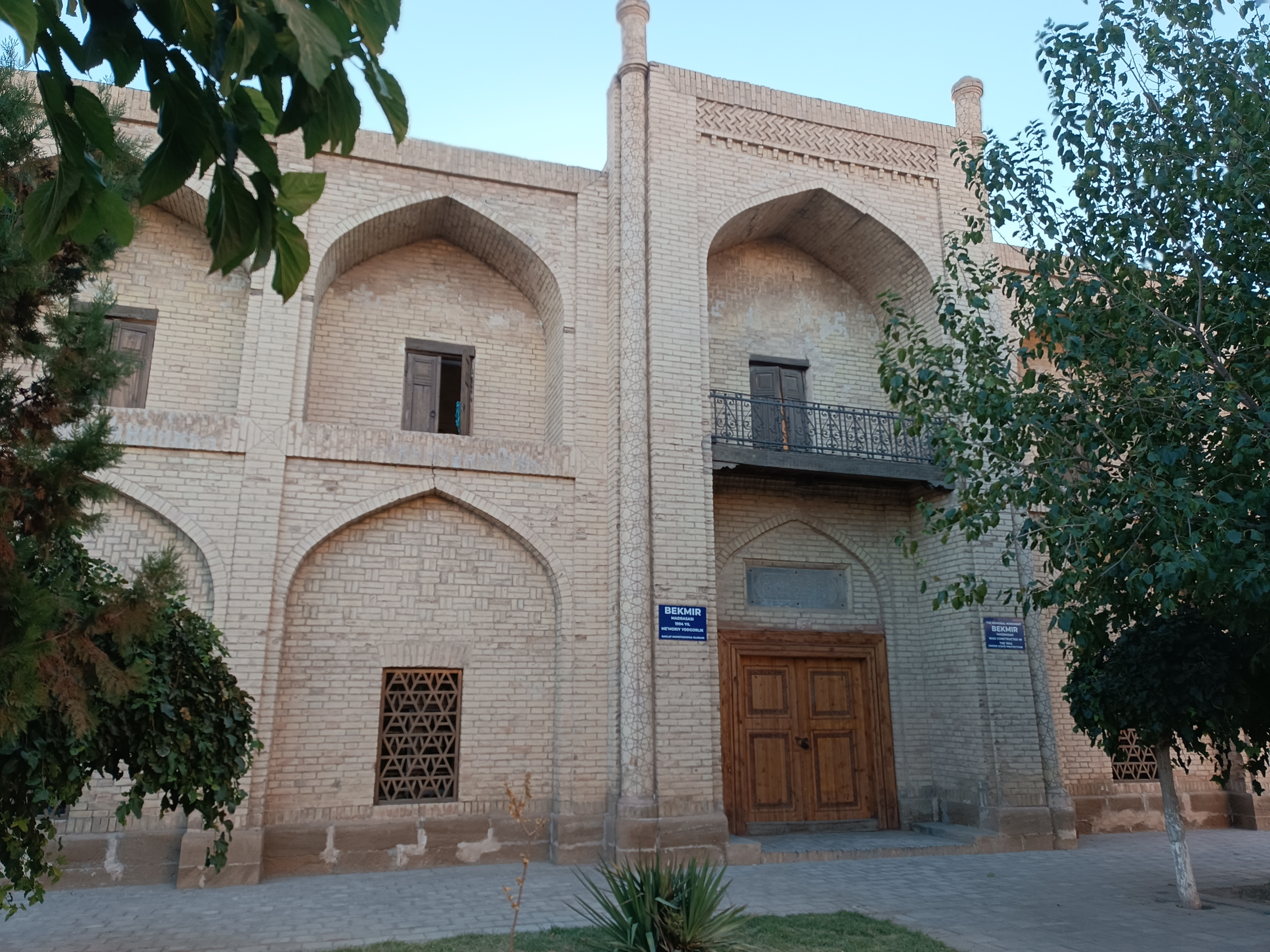
2023 photo of the monument

The Bekmir Madrasa is a historical and cultural monument located in the Darvozatutak neighborhood of Qarshi city, Qashqadaryo region, Uzbekistan. Bekmurodboy Madrasa is included in the National Register of Immovable Property of Uzbekistan's Material and Cultural Heritage by the Decree of the President of the Republic of Uzbekistan “On measures to radically improve the activities in the field of preservation of material and cultural heritage objects” dated December 19, 2018 No. PQ-4068.

The mosque is currently located in the Odina garden of the “Old City” part of Qarshi city.

== Names ==
This architectural monument was built by Bekmurodboy, who was a Cossack of the Manghit tribe. He was famous among the city dwellers as Bekmir Cossack. Therefore, the Madrasa built by Bekmurodboy was also called “Bekmir Cossack”. Nowadays, the madrasa is called Bekmir Madrasa by the people.

== History ==
Bekmurodboy Madrasa was built in 1911 (Hijri 1329) on the north side of the main square of Qarshi fortress - Registan. Before the revolution, women studied at this madrasa. In fact, for a few periods it was called “Women’s Academy”.

== Architecture ==
The name of the person who built the madrasa, the name of the architect who built it, and the date of construction are written in Persian on the marble plaque under the portal of the madrasa. The madrasa was built in the Bukhara style without domes, with a flat roof made of wooden beams, with a length of 24.0 meters and a width of 20.5 meters. No bricks were used in its construction. There are classrooms on the right and left sides of the entrance from the portal. Its courtyard is also large, with an area of 12.1 x 11.8 meters. There are 23 cells built for the students of science around it. The cells are located on the right and left sides of the entrance. The cells are mainly composed of one room, without decoration, with metal windows on the door frame, from which light enters. The portal of the madrasa is not very high. The top of the two sides of the portal is decorated with carved wooden domes. There are minarets at the two corners of the building, which are quite large. Bekmurodboy Madrasa is mainly one-story, with cells on the second floor on the portal side. The plan of the madrasa is similar to that of Shermuhammad Madrasa. The two cells on the second floor on the southeast side of the madrasa do not match the architectural appearance of the madrasa, and they were built much later.
