= History of Arabs in Afghanistan =

Overview of pre-1970s Arab people in Afghanistan

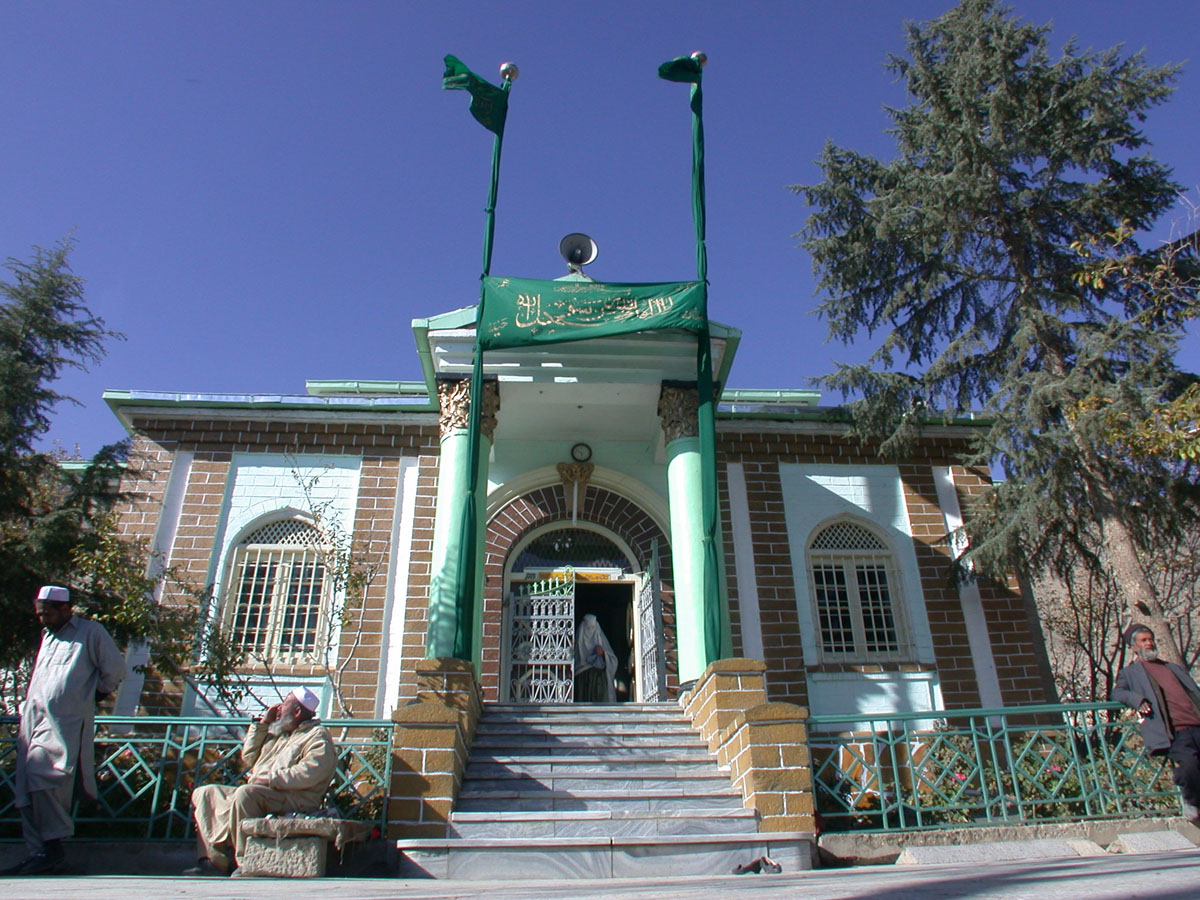
Mausoleum of an unknown Arab who was martyred during the Islamic conquest of Afghanistan in Kabul.

The history of Arabs in Afghanistan spans over one millennium since the 7th century beginning with the Islamic expansion all the way until the early 20th century. The Ethnic Arabs of Afghanistan are an ethnic minority making up 1-2% of the country's population. They speak a distinct dialect of Arabic called Central Asian Arabic along with either Dari (Persian) or Pashto. Most of the early Arab communities in Afghanistan gradually lost their native language. However, a number of villages commonly referred to as Qaryeh-ye ʿArabhā (“villages of Arabs”) continue to preserve Arabic as a spoken language. Within these communities, traditional dress, cultural practices, and other markers of Arab heritage have also been retained. In recent years, renewed efforts have emerged to safeguard not only the Arabic language but also the broader Arab identity in Afghanistan, particularly under the current government, reflecting an increased recognition of the cultural and historical significance of this minority population.

Afghan Arabs are still considered a recognisable distinct ethnic group according to the Constitution of Afghanistan. Afghans who carry titles and surnames such as Sayyid, Hashimi, Quraishi, and Tamimi are usually of Arab descent.

== First wave ==
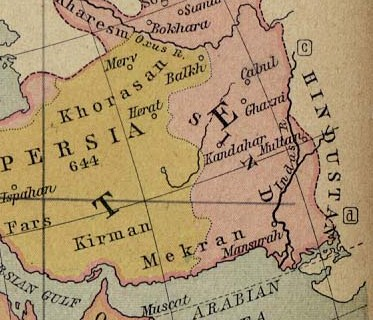
Names of territories during the Caliphate

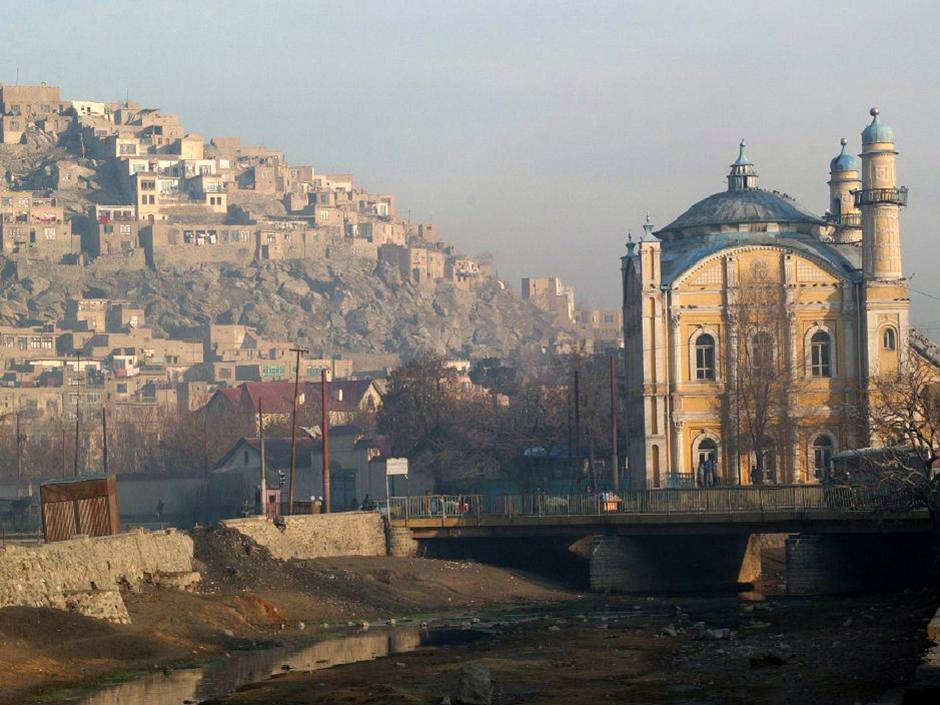
The Shah-Do Shamshira Mosque in Kabul

At the end of the 7th century, the Umayyad Arabs entered into the area now known as Afghanistan after decisively defeating the Sasanian Empire in Nihawand. Following this colossal defeat, the last Sasanian shah, Yazdegerd III, who became a hunted fugitive, fled eastward deep into Central Asia. In pursuing Yazdegerd, the route the Arabs selected to enter the area was from north-eastern Iran and thereafter into Herat where they stationed a large portion of their army before advancing toward eastern Afghanistan. Some Arabs settled in these new areas and married locals while adopting new customs. Other groups and contingents who elected not to settle gradually pushed eastwards but encountered resistance in areas surrounding Bamiyan. When ultimately arriving at Kabul, the Arabs confronted the Kabul Shahan who had built a long defensive wall around the city. The bloodiest war in Kabul was in Chahardi area where still tombs of Arabs killed in that war exist in Darulaman area. The most famous Arab character killed in that war was Shah-do Shamshira, whose tomb is located near Kabul river in Asmayee street. One of the most famous Commanders who fought against Arab invaders is known as Mazangi. Mazangi was in command at the battle of Asmayee (Kohi-Sherdarwaza) where Shah-Do Shamshira was killed. There is a number sights where Arab invaders fought in Kabul, but the bloodiest battle after Asmayee was the battle of Alwoden in the area known as Darul Aman today. The historical details of this battle remains largely unknown, though the Arabs were nonetheless subdued in the long term.

In the year 44 (664 AD), the Caliph Moavia Bin Aby Soofian nominated Zeead, the son of Oomya, to the government of Bussora, Seestan, and Khorassan. In the same year also Abdool Ruhman Bin Shimur, another Arab Ameer of distinction, marched from Murv to Kabul, where he made converts of upwards of twelve thousand persons... Saad was recalled in the year 59, and Abdool Ruhman, the son of Zeead, who formerly invaded Kabul, was nominated ruler of Khorassan... Shortly after his arrival in Khorassan, Sulim deputed his brother, Yezeed Bin Zeead, to Seestan. Not long after, Yezeed, having learned that the Prince of Kabul, throwing off his allegiance, had attacked and taken prisoner Aby Oobeyda, the son of Zeead, the late governor of Seestan, he marched with a force to recover that province, but was defeated in a pitched battle. When Sulim heard this news, he sent Tilla Bin Abdoolla, an officer of his court, as envoy to the court of Kabul, to ransom Aby Oobeyda; to obtain which object he paid 500,000 dirhems. Tilla afterwards received the government of Seestan as a reward for his services on this occasion, where, having collected a large force, he subdued Kabul in the short term and Khalid Bin Abdoolla (said by some to be the son of Khalid Bin Wuleed, and by others the son of Aboo Jehl) was nominated to its government.

— Muhammad Qasim Hindu Shah, (1560–1620)

Despite the lack of much written accounts, another famous archaeological legacy of this battle remains standing in Kabul, notably the tomb of the Shah-e Do Shamshira (translated into, The leader with the Two Swords in Persian) next to the Shah-Do Shamshira Mosque. The site, located near Kabul's market district, was built near the area where an Arab commander died.

Despite fighting heroically with a sword in each hand, one of the Muslim head commanders fell in battle. It is his memory that is honored by the mosque today. The two-story edifice was built in the 1920s on the order of King Amanullah's mother on the site of one of Kabul's first mosques.

Following the Arab confrontation, the region was made part of Khorasan with its seat of power in Herat in the west. The Arabs later partially relinquished some of their territorial control though reasserted its authority approximately 50 years later in 750 when the Abbasid caliphs replaced the Umayyads. By then, many Arabs increasingly blended with locals as the Arabic identity in the region began to undergo a significant change. Arab contingents settled throughout various parts of present-day Afghanistan including the Wardak, Logar, Kabul, Balkh and in the Sulaiman Mountains. Over time they adopted local customs and languages, some became Persianized while others became Afghanized who followed Pashtunwali.

Khalid being subsequently superseded, became apprehensive of returning to Arabia by the route of Persia, on account of the enemies he had in that country, and equally so of remaining in Kabul, under his successor. He retired, therefore, with his family, and a number of Arab retainers, into the Sooli-many mountains, situated between Mooltan and Pishawur, where he took up his residence, and gave his daughter in marriage to one of the Afghan chiefs, who had become a proselyte to Maho-medism. From this marriage many children were born, among whom were two sons famous in history. The one Lody, the other Soor; who each, subsequently, became head of the tribes which to this day bear their name.

— Muhammad Qasim Hindu Shah, (1560–1620)

It was during the reign of the Ya'qub Saffari that Arabic began losing its influence in the region. Nevertheless, the Arabs attempted to re-exert their influence in the area by supporting the Samanid rulers of Balkh who in return, assisted the Abbasid Arabs against the defiant Saffarid dynasty.

Despite maintaining some clothing customs and attire, most of the early Afghan-Arabs (or Arab-Afghans) gradually lost their original tongue of Arabic. This is confirmed in the 15th century work, Baburnama, which notes that the Arabs of Afghanistan have virtually lost the Arabic language and instead speak Persian and Pashto. Although the exact number of Arab-Afghans remains unknown, mostly due to ambiguous claims of descent, an 18th-century academic estimated that they number at approximately 60,000 families.

== Second wave ==
Following the Bolshevik Revolution during World War I, significant numbers of Sunni Arabs residing in Bukhara, as well as from Southern Iran and Iranian Khorasan, and other regions of Central Asia under Russian rule, migrated to Afghanistan, where conditions allowed for greater religious freedom and reduced fear of persecution or discrimination.[1] Concurrently, many Sunni Arabs from Southern Iran and Iranian Khorasan were compelled to emigrate due to widespread economic marginalization and systemic discrimination, which became particularly pronounced under the reign of Reza Shah Pahlavi. Estimates suggest that approximately 30,000 Arabs resided in Bukhara during the mid-nineteenth century.[2] The Arab communities that entered Afghanistan during this period largely retained their distinct dialect of Central Asian Arabic, distinguishing them from earlier waves of Afghan Arabs.

Some Arabs from the second wave intermarried with the local population as they adopted the languages of northern Afghanistan, namely Uzbek, Turkmen, and Persian language. Many settled in Kunduz, Takhar and Sar-e Pol provinces. While they still view themselves as Arabs, some of the Arabs from the second wave that have integrated into the more denser cities of the country have lost their language of Arabic like those from the original wave, but many Arab villages in the isolated northern parts of the country have still kept their language culture and traditions while adopting Persian as-well.

Although some tribal names, including Qureshi and Shaiboni are still remembered, some of the Arabs view genealogies as unimportant. Many of these Afghan Arabs work in the agricultural industry, often growing cotton and wheat while others raise karakul sheep. According to an academic, the Central Asian Arabs have not had any contact with Arabs from the Arab World since the time of Tamerlane (circa 1400).

The main body of the Afghan Arabs are found in the northern provinces of the country such as Shibarghan and Balkh. In contemporary times, the majority of Afghan Arabs have adopted Dari as their primary language; however, a number of relatively isolated settlements often referred to as Qaryeh-ye ʿArabhā (“villages of Arabs”) continue to preserve Arabic as a spoken language. Within these communities, traditional dress, cultural practices, and other markers of Arab heritage have also been maintained. There are other such Persian-speaking Arabs to the east, between Shebergan, Mazar-i Sharif, Kholm and Kunduz living in pockets. Their identification as Arabs is based on their unique dialect of Arabic as-well as tribal identity which may in fact point to the 7th and 8th centuries migration to this and other Central Asian locales of many Arab tribes from Arabia in the wake of the Islamic conquests of the region.

== Third wave ==
During the 1980s Soviet–Afghan War, many Arab Muslims arrived and volunteered to help Afghans fight Soviet Union. Some of these remained after the Soviets withdrew from the country and were granted citizenship. Others intermarried with local Afghans while some arrived with their families to Afghanistan. Kandahar is home to a small Arab cemetery where over 70 graves belong to Arab al-Qaeda functionaries who were killed as a result of the U.S. war on terror. These Arabs are revered by the Taliban and the Salafist sympathizers as shahid (martyrs).

== Central Asian Arabic and the Afghan Dialect ==
The Arabic dialects of Central Asia are generally grammatically believed to trace their origins to southern Iraq, from which early settlers introduced them during the Islamic conquests of Transoxiana in the 7th and 8th centuries CE, and later through subsequent Abbasid expansions. Arab tribes and military contingents established themselves both in major urban centers such as Balkh, Merv, and Nishapur, as well as in rural and desert areas whose environments more closely resembled the Arabian Peninsula. While those who remained in cities gradually assimilated into Persian- and Turkic-speaking societies, the more isolated nomadic bedouins and rural communities preserved their speech in relative seclusion. Over time, however, separation from other Arabic-speaking regions and constant contact with Iranian and Turkic languages led to the formation of distinct, highly divergent dialects, classified today as Bukharian and Kashkadarya (in Uzbekistan and Tajikistan), Khorasani (in eastern Iran), and Afghan Arabic (in northern Afghanistan). Although they share certain features with Iraqi Arabic, these dialects have developed independently to the point that mutual intelligibility with other Arabic varieties is limited.

The Afghan dialect of Central Asian Arabic represents a continuation of this historical process, shaped by multiple waves of migration. Many Arabic-speaking groups relocated from Bukhara and Kashkadarya to northern Afghanistan in the 18th and 19th centuries, particularly in response to Russian expansion and later Soviet pressures. Settling mainly around Balkh and Mazar-i-Sharif, these communities initially maintained their language and cultural practices, but assimilation into Persian- and Turkic-speaking society gradually reduced the number of Arabic speakers. Today, Afghan Arabic survives primarily in a handful of villages in Balkh Province, where it coexists with Dari, Uzbek, Turkmen, and Pashto. The dialect has absorbed significant lexical and phonological influence from these surrounding languages, giving it a hybrid character that nonetheless preserves archaic features linking it to its Iraqi origins. Despite its resilience, Afghan Arabic, like the other Central Asian varieties, faces severe endangerment due to intergenerational language loss and the dominant role of Persian and Turkic languages in education, administration, and wider society.

== Regional groups ==
=== Balkh ===
Around 900 families live in Khoshal Abad and Yakhdan villages of Dawlat Abad district of the province, and the villagers trace their lineage back to the third caliph, ʿUthmān, in the 7th century. These families are primarily engaged in agriculture and carpet weaving. Most Arabs in Balkh Province speak Arabic as their mother tongue and Dari as a second language. While some of the older generations never learned to speak either of Afghanistan's two official languages, Dari and Pashto, many younger people are now taught Dari in schools and are gradually losing fluency in Arabic; approximately 40 percent can no longer speak it. Arabs who settled in northern Balkh Province express concern that their culture is being eroded as increasing numbers adopt the dominant languages and traditions of Afghanistan. Arabs also form small minorities in the town and district of Kholm, where many continue to identify as ethnic Arabs, although Arabic is no longer spoken. Up until recent times, however, both Arab identity and efforts at cultural and linguistic preservation have remained important within these communities. In particular, recent initiatives ranging from community-led programs to limited recognition by the government have sought to promote the teaching of Arabic and the safeguarding of Arab cultural practices, reflecting an ongoing attachment to their historical heritage despite broader patterns of assimilation.

=== Jowzjan ===
There are about 1,000 families living in Hassanabad of Shebarghan, capital of Jowzjan province, and in Sultan Arigh village of Aqcha district that identify themselves as Arabs. None, however, has spoken Arabic in their collective memory, with Dari forming their native language.

=== Nangarhar ===
There are many Arab families living in the city of Nangarhar, Jalalabad. The majority of the people living in the villages claim to have Arab ethnicity, Either Iraq, Egypt, and any other Arab nation. The majority have had lost their language and speak Dari with Pashto interconnected which has created an accent.

== See also ==
- Iranian Arabs
- Arab diaspora
- Central Asian Arabic
- Farooqi
- Hashemi
- Muslim conquests of Afghanistan
- Pashtunization
- Persianization
- Sayyid
- Siddiqui
- Qureshi
