= Arabs in Serbia =

Арапи у Србији العرب في صربيا

Total population
- 1,484 Egyptians (2022) 1,769 Libyans (est.); 500 Palestinians (est.)

Regions with significant populations
- Belgrade

Languages
- Arabic and Serbian

Religion
- Islam, Christianity

Related ethnic groups
- Arab diaspora

Arabs in Serbia are mostly expatriates from a range of Arab countries, particularly Libya, Lebanon, Syria, Palestine, Iraq, and Jordan; and also small groups from Egypt, Algeria, Tunisia, Morocco, and Sudan.

== History ==
Lebanese and Syrian citizens were the first Arabs to arrive in modern Serbia; in the 1970s and 1980s, many students from Iraq and Syria were enrolled at the University of Belgrade. More recently, as a result of the Arab Spring and the Syrian Civil War, large numbers of Arabs transited Serbia as refugees, trying to immigrate to Western Europe.

== Communities ==
=== Egyptians ===
Egyptians are recognized ethnic minority in Serbia. According to data from the 2022 census, there were 1,484 ethnic Egyptians in Serbia.

=== Libyans ===
There is a small community of Libyans in Serbia, mainly residing in Belgrade. There has been a Libyan School in Belgrade since 1997, which was expanded in 2012 to cater to the Libyan ethnic community.

=== Iraqis ===
Most of the Iraqis in Serbia are educated people, and they view Serbia as a "friendly and brotherly" country.

=== Syrians ===
In 2023, 36,360 Syrians were registered in Serbia, transiting on their way to Western Europe, with only a small fraction remaining or applying for asylum in Serbia.

== Notable people ==
- Muhamed Jusufspahić – mufti, maternal Egyptian descent
- Josif Al Said – MMA fighter, paternal Jordanian descent
- Amjad Migati – politician, Jordanian
- Nedal Halil – businessman, Jordanian

== See also ==
- Arab diaspora
- Algerian diaspora
- Egyptian diaspora
- Iraqi diaspora
- Lebanese diaspora
- Moroccan diaspora
- Palestinian diaspora
- Syrian diaspora
- Tunisian diaspora
- Algeria–Serbia relations
- Egypt–Serbia relations
- Iraq–Serbia relations
- Palestine–Serbia relations
- Serbia–Syria relations
- Serbia–United Arab Emirates relations
