= Afghans =

People of Afghanistan

افغان‌ ها (Dari) افغانان (Pashto)
- Map of the Afghan diaspora: Afghanistan + 1,000,000 + 100,000 + 10,000 + 1,000

Total population
- 48–52 million (est.)

Regions with significant populations
- Iran: c. 3–5 million (2023)
- Pakistan: 1,285,754 (2022)
- Germany: 425,000 (2022)
- United States: 300,000 (2022)
- UAE: 300,000 (2012)
- Russia: 150,000 (2017)
- Turkey: 129,323 (2021)
- Canada: 125,305 (2022)
- France: 100,000 (2025)
- Sweden: 82,883 (2024)
- United Kingdom: 79,000 (2019)
- Australia: 59,797 (2021)
- The Netherlands: 51,830 (2021)
- Denmark: 22,319 (2025)
- Greece: 21,456 (2021)
- Ukraine: 20,000 (2001)
- India: 15,806 (2021)
- Austria: 44,918 (2023)
- Switzerland: 14,523 (2021)
- Finland: 12,044 (2021)
- Italy: 11,121–12,096 (2021)
- Norway: 24,823 (2022)
- Uzbekistan: 10,000 (2017)
- Israel: 10,000 (2012)
- Brazil: 7,352 (2025)
- Tajikistan: 6,775 (2021)
- Qatar: 4,000 (2012)
- Japan: 3,509 (2020)
- New Zealand: 3,414 (2013)
- Malaysia: 2,661 (2021)
- Kazakhstan: 2,500+ (2021)
- Romania: 2,384 (2020)
- Kyrgyzstan: 2,000 (2002)
- Ireland: 1,200 (2019)
- Spain: 300–2,500 (2018)
- Portugal: 883

Languages
- Dari, Pashto and other languages of Afghanistan

Religion
- Predominantly: Islam (Sunni majority and Shia minority); Minority: Hinduism, Sikhism, Christianity, Zoroastrianism, Judaism, Baháʼí Faith

Related ethnic groups
- Pashtuns, Tajiks, Hazaras, Uzbeks, Turkmens, Aimaqs, Baloch, Pashayi, others

Afghans (Note: Dari: افغان‌ها, pronounced [ʔäv.ɣɑː.nɑ́ː, ʔäf.ɣɑː.nɑ́ː]; Pashto: افغانان, pronounced [ʔap.ɣɑ.nɑn, ʔaʊ.ɣɑ.nɑn]) are the citizens and nationals of Afghanistan. They are composed of various ethnic groups, of which Pashtuns, Tajiks, Hazaras, and Uzbeks are the largest.

The two main languages spoken among the Afghan people are Dari (a variety of Persian) and Pashto. Historically, the ethnonym "Afghan" used to refer to Pashtuns, but later came to refer to all ethnicities in Afghanistan after the 1964 Constitution of Afghanistan proposed by King Mohammad Zahir Shah.

== Etymology ==
The earliest mention of the name Afghan (Abgân) is by Shapur I of the Sassanid Empire during the 3rd century CE, In the 4th century, the word "Afghans/Afghana" (αβγανανο) as reference to the Pashtun people is mentioned in the Bactrian documents found in Northern Afghanistan. The word 'Afghan' is of Persian origin and refers to the Pashtun people. Some scholars suggest that the word "Afghan" is derived from the words awajan/apajan in Avestan and ava-Han/apa-Han in Sanskrit, which means "killing, striking, throwing and resisting, or defending." Under the Sasanians, and possibly the Parthian Empire, the word was used to refer to men of a certain Persian sect. In the past, several scholars sought a connection with "horse", Skt.aśva-, Av.aspa-, i.e. the Aśvaka or Aśvakayana, the name of the Aśvakan or Assakan, the ancient inhabitants of the Hindu Kush region. Some have theorized that the name of the Aśvakan or Assakan has been preserved in that of the modern Pashtun, with the name Afghan being derived from Asvakan.

As an adjective, the word Afghan also means "of or relating to Afghanistan or its people, language or culture". According to the 1964 Constitution of Afghanistan, all Afghans citizens are equal in rights and obligations before the law. The fourth article of the Constitution of the Islamic Republic of Afghanistan, which was valid until 2021, states that citizens of Afghanistan consist of Pashtun, Tajik, Uzbek, Turkmen, Baloch, Pashayi, Nuristani, Aimaq, Arab, Kyrgyz, Qizilbash, Gurjar, Brahui, and members of other ethnicities. There are political disputes regarding this: there are members of the non-Pashtun ethnicities of Afghanistan that reject the term Afghan being applied to them, and there are Pashtuns in Pakistan that wish to have the term Afghan applied to them.

=== Usage as an ethnonym ===
The pre-nation state, historical ethnonym Afghan was used to refer to a member of the Pashtun ethnic group. Due to the changing political nature of the state, the meaning has changed, and the term has shifted to refer to the national identity of people from Afghanistan of all ethnicities.

From a more limited, ethnological point of view, "Afḡhān" is the term by which the Persian-speakers of Afghanistan (and the non-Pashtō-speaking ethnic groups generally) designate the Pashtūn. The equation Afghans = Pashtūn has been propagated all the more, both in and beyond Afghanistan, because the Pashtūn tribal confederation has maintained its hegemony in the country, numerically and politically.

=== Variations ===
The term Afghani refers to the unit of Afghan currency. The term is also often used in the English language (and appears in some dictionaries) for a person or thing related to Afghanistan, although some have expressed the opinion that this usage is incorrect. The reason for this usage might be because the term "Afghani" (افغانی) is in fact a valid demonym for Afghans in the overall Persian language, whereas "Afghan" is derived from Pashto. Thus, "Afghan" is the anglicized form of "Afghani" when translating from Dari Persian, but not from Pashto. Another variant is Afghanistani and Afghanese, which has been seldom used in place of Afghan.

== Ethnicities ==
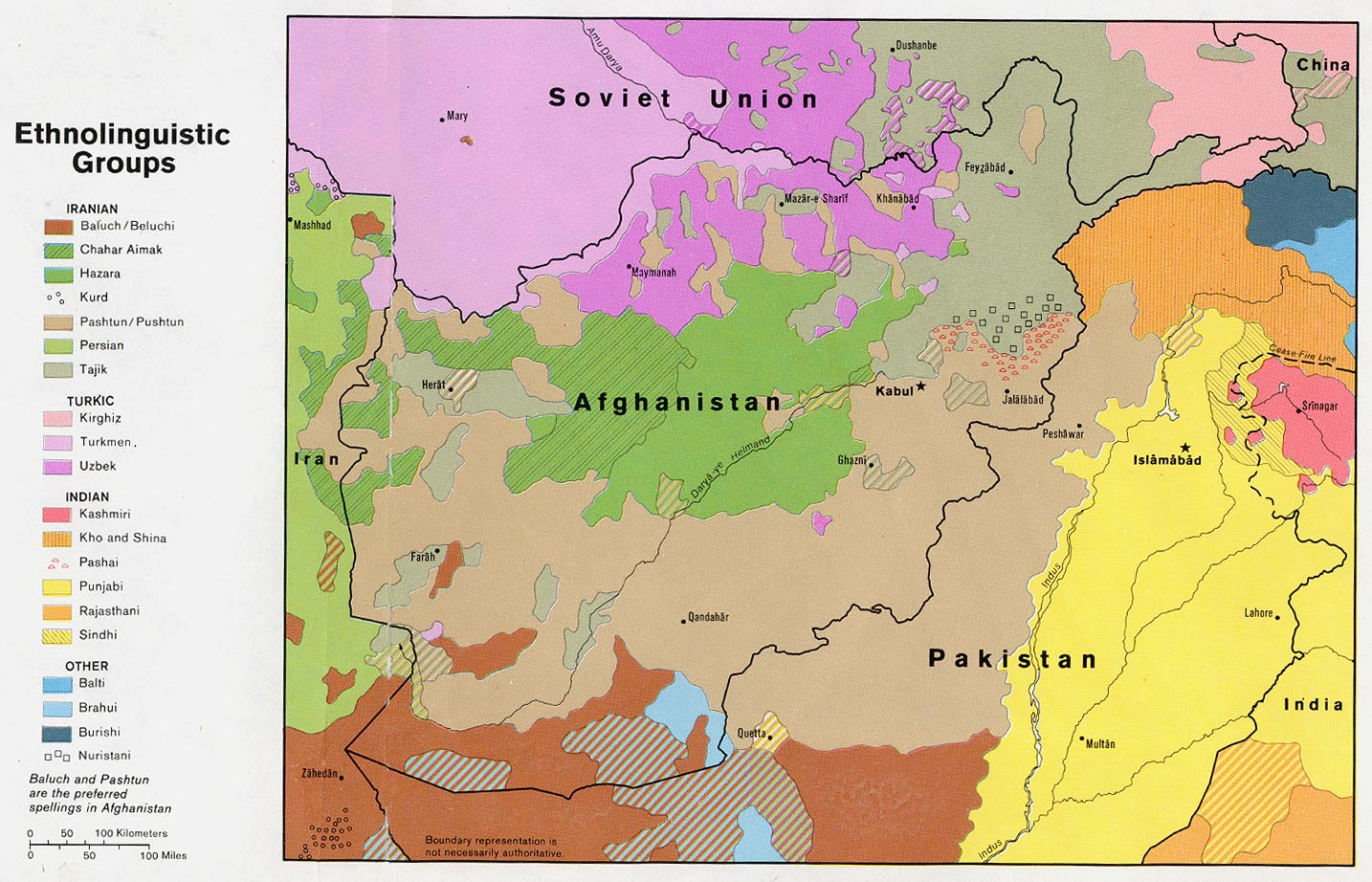
Ethnolinguistic groups in Afghanistan and its surroundings (1982).

Afghans come from various ethnic backgrounds. The largest ethnic groups are Pashtuns. Historian Clifford Edmund Bosworth defines "Afghan" primarily as a historical ethnonym for the Pashtun people. In his scholarly analysis of medieval Islamic sources, such as the 10th-century geography Hudūd al-ʿĀlam, Bosworth notes that the term was originally restricted to specific Pashtun tribes residing in the frontier regions between the Hindu Kush and the Indus River. He maintains a clear distinction between these "Afghans" and other ethnic groups residing in the region, such as the Tajiks and Hazaras (sedentary Persian-speakers) and Uzbeks whom he identifies as having separate linguistic and historical origins.

While Bosworth acknowledges that the 1964 Constitution of Afghanistan formally standardised "Afghan" as a national demonym for all citizens regardless of their ethnicity, his work emphasizes that for most of the region's history, the term remained synonymous with Pashtun identity. Tajiks, Hazaras, and Uzbeks have diverse origins including of Iranic, Turkic or Mongolic ethnolinguistic roots.

== Religions ==
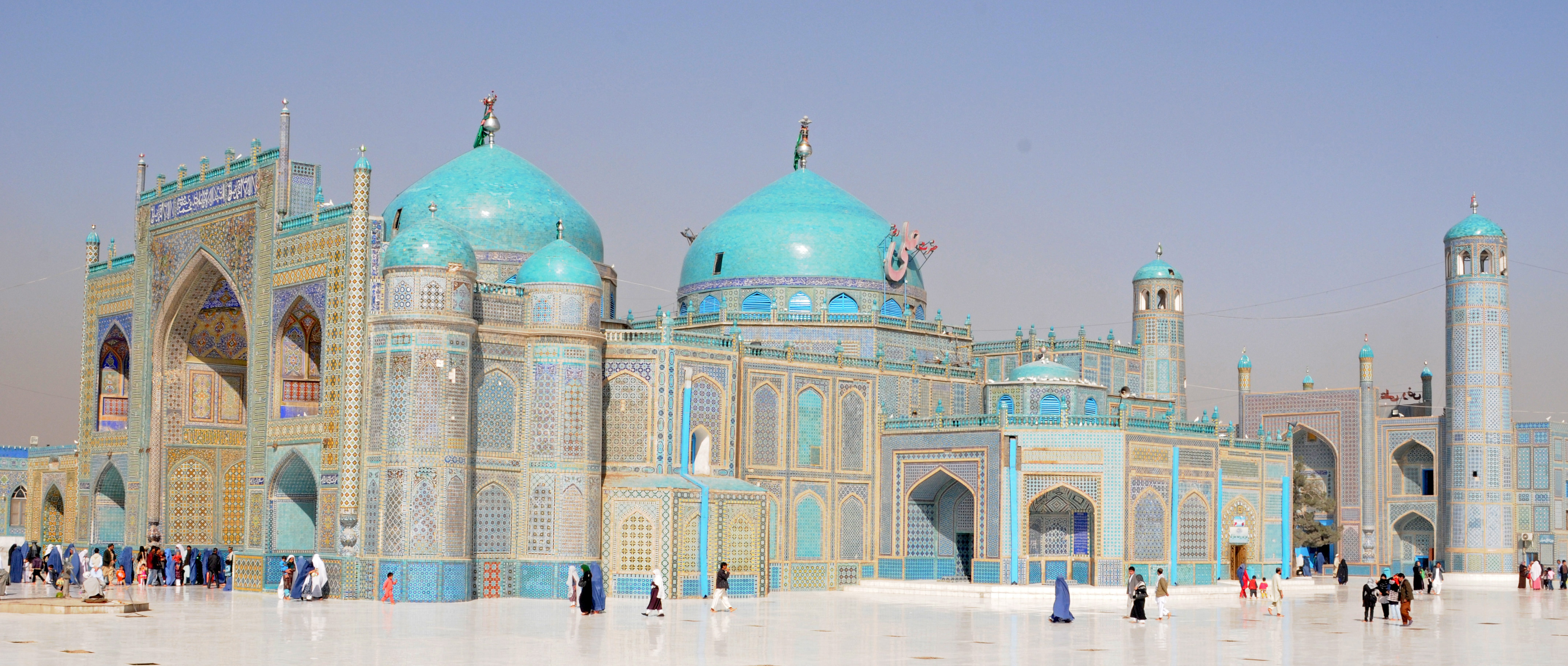
The Masjid-e-Kabud, popularly known as the Blue Mosque, in Mazar-i-Sharif, Balkh Province, Afghanistan, April 3, 2012.

The Afghans are predominantly and traditionally followers of Islam, of whom around 85-90% are of Sunni. Other religious minorities include the Afghan Hindus, Afghan Sikhs, Afghan Jews and Afghan Christians.

== Culture ==
Historically, Afghan culture is centered on Pashtunwali, an ancient, pre-Islamic code of conduct based on core tenets such as hospitality (melmastia), personal and tribal honour (nang), and retributive justice (badal). While oral tradition served as the primary vessel for this culture for centuries, the oldest direct written literary records of Pashtun culture and social values are found in Pashto poetry and prose, such as the 16th-century and later 19th-century works.

Broader Afghan culture, encompassing the diverse ethnic groups within the modern borders, is historically and linguistically linked to the Persian world.

== See also ==
- Demographics of Afghanistan
- Afghan (ethnonym)
- Name of Afghanistan
- Afghan diaspora

== Sources ==
- Fikrat, Mohammad Asef; Umar, Suheyl (2008). "Afghan". In Madelung, Wilferd; Daftary, Farhad (eds.). Encyclopaedia Islamica Online. Brill Online. ISSN 1875-9831.
