= Iraq–Kosovo relations =

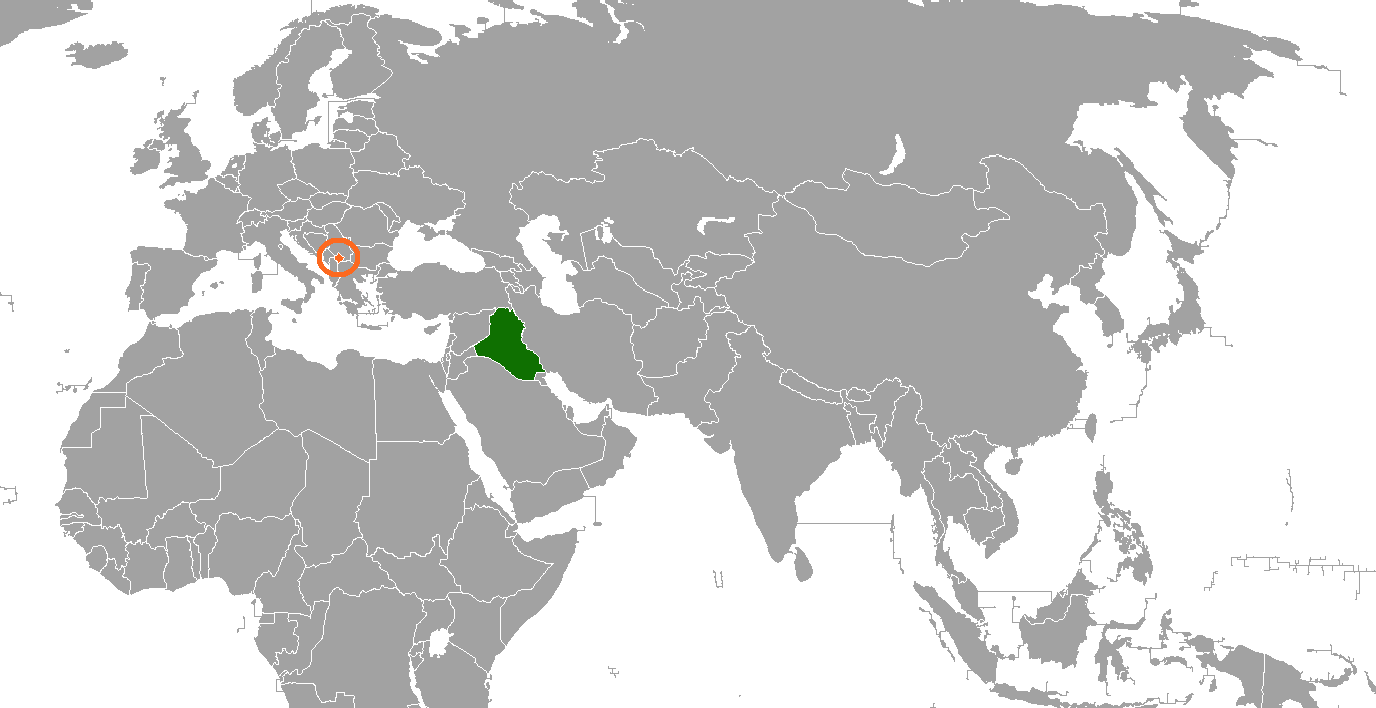
- Iraq: Kosovo

As of 2025, although there has been limited diplomatic contacts between Iraq and Kosovo in several instances, there are no formal diplomatic relations between two states as Iraq has not recognized Kosovo as a sovereign state.

== History ==
At a meeting on 28 May 2009 with Kosovo's Foreign Minister, Skënder Hyseni, the representative of Iraq to the United Nations, Hamid Al Bayati, reportedly said that Kosovo deserved to be recognised by other states and that Iraq's decision to recognise would come at a suitable time.

At a meeting in September 2009 with Hyseni, Iraqi Foreign Minister, Hoshyar Zebari, said that Kosovo's request for recognition was being studied closely. He said that he would forward the request to his Government, and that "we understand the right of peoples to self-determination".

On 18 February 2010, following a meeting with Iraqi prime minister Nouri al-Maliki, Serbian Foreign Minister Vuk Jeremić said that Serbia strongly supports Iraq's territorial integrity just as Iraq supports Serbia. In May 2010, Ali al-Baldawi, a representative of the Islamic Supreme Council of Iraq, reportedly said that relations would be established with Kosovo once his party, which won the latest elections, forms a new government. On 6 August 2010, following a meeting with prime minister al-Maliki, the Serbian Defence Minister Dragan Šutanovac said that Iraq did not recognise the independence of Kosovo and added that Iraq had supported the sovereignty and territorial integrity of Serbia.

In March 2011, Kosovo's prime minister Hashim Thaçi met with the Iraqi vice-president Tariq al-Hashimi, who promised that Iraq would consider the recognition of Kosovo in the immediate future to open the way for the promotion of good relations between the two countries. In October 2011 Iraq's ambassador to Belgrade, Falah Abdulsada, said that Iraq supports international law and international mechanisms, and has not changed its position of non-recognition of Kosovo.

In September 2012, Iraqi president, Jalal Talabani, said that he appreciated the interest of Kosovo in creating friendship with his country, and he invited Kosovo's deputy prime minister, Behgjet Pacolli, to make an official visit to Iraq in order to discuss in more depth further steps to create inter-state relations. In November 2012, Zebari expressed his country's support for an independent Kosovo, and appreciated the progress achieved in Kosovo after the declaration of independence. He also said that Iraqi authorities followed the developments in Kosovo with great care.

== See also ==
- Foreign relations of Iraq
- Foreign relations of Kosovo
- Iraq–Serbia relations
