= Arab diaspora =

Dispersion of Arabs around the globe

Arab diaspora الشتات العربي

Total population
- 30–50 million

Regions with significant populations
- Brazil: 10,000,000–12,000,000
- France: 5,500,000–7,000,000
- Turkey: 5,000,000 (Note: Including 1–2 million native Arabs and 3,763,565 registered Syrian refugees.)
- United States: 3,700,000
- Colombia: 3,200,000 - 3,500,000
- Argentina: 2,000,000 —3,500,000
- Venezuela: 2,000,000
- Iran: 1,600,000–4,000,000
- Chad: 1,800,000
- Germany: 1,401,950
- Spain: 1,350,000
- Mexico: 1,100,000
- Chile: 800,000
- Canada: 750,925
- Italy: 705,968
- Sweden: 543,350
- United Kingdom: 500,000
- Australia: 500,000
- Netherlands: 480,000–613,800
- India: 300,000
- Ivory Coast: 300,000
- Honduras: 280,000
- Guatemala: 200,000
- Ecuador: 170,000
- Niger: 150,000 (2006)
- Denmark: 121,000
- Indonesia: 118,866 (2010)
- El Salvador: 100,000
- Eritrea: 80,000 (2010)
- Uruguay: 75,000
- Tanzania: 70,000
- Kenya: 59,021 (2019)
- Somalia: 30,000
- Belize: 10,000

Languages
- Arabic (mother tongue), French, Italian, Spanish, English, Portuguese, Malay, Filipino, Hebrew, Indonesian, Japanese, German, Turkish, Persian, and other languages among others

Religion
- Predominantly Islam in Europe and Asia, Christianity in the Americas, but also Druze, and irreligion

Related ethnic groups
- Lebanese diaspora; Iraqi diaspora; Egyptian diaspora; Yemeni diaspora; Palestinian diaspora; Syrian diaspora; Moroccan diaspora

Arab diaspora (Arabic: الشتات العربي, romanized: ash-shatāt al-ʿarabī) refers to the dispersion of Arabs who live outside of the Arab world. It can refer to descendants of the Arab emigrants who, voluntarily or forcibly, migrated from their native lands to non-Arab countries, primarily in the Americas, Europe, Southeast Asia, and West Africa.

Immigrants from Arab countries, such as Lebanon, Syria and Palestine, also form significant diasporas in other Arab states – see Palestinian refugees and refugees of the Syrian civil war.

== Overview ==
Arab expatriates contribute to the circulation of financial and human capital in the region and thus significantly promote regional development. In 2009 Arab countries received a total of US$35.1 billion in remittance in-flows and remittances sent to Jordan, Egypt and Lebanon from other Arab countries are 40 to 190 per cent higher than trade revenues between these and other Arab countries. Large numbers of Arabs migrated to West Africa, particularly Côte d'Ivoire, Senegal, Sierra Leone, Liberia, and Nigeria. Since the end of the civil war in 2002, Lebanese traders have become re-established in Sierra Leone.

According to Saudi Aramco World, the largest concentration of Arabs outside the Arab World is in Brazil, which has 9 million Brazilians of Arab ancestry. Of these 9 million Arabs, 6 million are of Lebanese ancestry, making Brazil's population of Lebanese equivalent to that of Lebanon itself. However, these figures are contradicted by the Brazilian Institute of Geography and Statistics (IBGE), which is the agency responsible for official collection of statistical information in Brazil. According to the 2010 Brazilian census conducted by IBGE, there were only 12,336 Lebanese nationals living in Brazil and other Arab nationalities were so small that they were not even listed. The Brazilian census does not ask about ancestry or family origin. There is a question about nationality and, according to the Brazilian law, any person born in Brazil is a Brazilian national by birth and right for any purpose, nationally or internationally — not an Arab. The last Brazilian census to ask about family origin was conducted in 1940. At that time, 107,074 Brazilians said they had a Syrian, Lebanese, Palestinian, Iraqi or Arab father. Native Arabs were 46,105 and naturalized Brazilians were 5,447. In 1940, Brazil had 41,169,321 inhabitants, hence Arabs and their children were 0.38% of Brazil's population in 1940.

The Arab diaspora can be found in Colombia, Argentina, Venezuela, Mexico and Chile. Palestinians cluster in Chile and Central America, particularly El Salvador, and Honduras. The Palestinian community in Chile is the fourth largest in the world after those in Israel, Lebanon, and Jordan. Arab Haitians (a large number of whom live in the capital) are more often than not, concentrated in financial areas where the majority of them establish businesses. In the United States, there are around 3.5 million people of Arab ancestry.

In the 2010 Indonesian census, 118,886 people, amounting to 0.05% of the population of Indonesia, identified themselves as being of Arab ethnicity.

There is also a small community of Yemeni Arabs in Hyderabad city of Telangana state in India who were brought from Hadhramaut region of Yemen to serve as army men during Nizam's rule. They are called the Chaush community. There is also presence of a tiny Iraqi refugee/immigrant community in India.

== See also ==
- Arabs in the Philippines
- Algerian British
- Arab Americans
- Arab Argentines
- Arab Australians
- Arab Brazilians
- Arab Canadians
- Arab Chileans
- Arab Colombians
- Arab Haitians
- Arab Indonesians
- Arab Malaysians
- Arab Mexicans
- Arab New Zealanders
- Arab Singaporeans
- Arab Uruguayans
- Arab Venezuelans
- Arabs in Austria
- Arabs in Bulgaria
- Arabs in the Caucasus
- Arabs in Europe
- Arabs in Finland
- Arabs in France
- Arabs in Germany
- Arabs in Greece
- Arabs in India
- Arabs in Italy
- Arabs in Japan
- Arabs in the Netherlands
- Arabs in Pakistan
- Arabs in Romania
- Arabs in Serbia
- Arabs in Spain
- Arabs in Sweden
- Arabs in Switzerland
- Arabs in Turkey
- Arma people (Saharan Arab and Spanish)
- British Arabs
- British Iraqis
- Chaush (Yemenis in South India)
- Egyptians in the United Kingdom
- Emirati diaspora
- Hadhrami diaspora
- History of Arabs in Afghanistan
- Iraqi Biradari (Iraqis residing in India and Pakistan)
- Iraqi diaspora
- Lebanese Americans
- Lebanese Colombians
- Lebanese Argentines
- Lebanese Australians
- Lebanese Brazilians
- Lebanese Canadians
- Lebanese diaspora
- Lebanese people in Ecuador
- List of Arab Americans
- Magyarab people (Egyptian Arab and Hungarian)
- Palestinian diaspora
- Refugees of Iraq
- Sri Lankan Moors
- Syrian Americans
- Yemeni Americans
- Yemenis in the United Kingdom
- Central Asian Arabs (Central Asian Arabic)
