= Arabs in Finland =

Total population
- 45,056 Arabic speakers (2025)

Regions with significant populations
- Helsinki, Turku and Tampere regions & Lahti and Oulu

Languages
- Arabic and Finnish

Religion
- Islam and Christianity

Related ethnic groups
- Arabs and Arab diaspora

Arabs in Finland (Arabic: العرب في فنلندا, romanized: al-ʻArab fī Finlandā) are residents and citizens of Finland who speak the Arabic language. Arabic is Finland's third most spoken foreign language, after Russian and Estonian. As of 2025, there were 44,956 Arabic-speaking people in Finland.

The largest Arabic-speaking minority groups in Finland are the Iraqi, the Syrian and the Moroccan.

== Status of Arabic ==
Arabic has for a long time been taught in Finnish schools as a native language for Arabs. Starting from 2019 fall, Arabic will be an optional B2 language in Finnish primary schools. As an academic subject it can be learned at University of Helsinki.

== Demographics ==
Historical population
| Year | Pop. | ±% p.a. |
|---|---|---|
| 1990 | 1,138 | — |
| 1995 | 2,901 | +20.58% |
| 2000 | 4,892 | +11.02% |
| 2005 | 7,117 | +7.79% |
| 2010 | 10,415 | +7.91% |
| 2015 | 16,713 | +9.92% |
| 2020 | 34,282 | +15.45% |
| 2025 | 45,056 | +5.62% |
Arabic speakers. Source: Statistics Finland

People with Arabic as mother tongue living in Finland according to Statistics Finland.

Arabic speakers by municipality (2024)
| Municipality | Population |
|---|---|
| Whole country | 43,534 |
| Helsinki | 10,998 |
| Espoo | 6,246 |
| Vantaa | 6,105 |
| Turku | 3,612 |
| Tampere | 2,605 |
| Lahti | 1,314 |
| Oulu | 1,092 |
| Kuopio | 864 |
| Vaasa | 762 |
| Jyväskylä | 584 |
| Kerava | 476 |
| Hämeenlinna | 461 |
| Porvoo | 419 |
| Jakobstad | 314 |
| Pori | 312 |
| Joensuu | 293 |
| Hyvinkää | 257 |
| Kaarina | 252 |
| Lappeenranta | 239 |
| Järvenpää | 233 |
| Mikkeli | 229 |
| Kouvola | 228 |
| Seinäjoki | 216 |
| Kotka | 209 |
| Tornio | 203 |
| Rovaniemi | 199 |
| Kirkkonummi | 174 |
| Kokkola | 172 |
| Forssa | 167 |
| Lohja | 167 |
| Raseborg | 165 |
| Kajaani | 161 |
| Nurmijärvi | 146 |
| Salo | 145 |
| Raisio | 140 |
| Pirkkala | 139 |
| Tuusula | 130 |
| Rauma | 127 |
| Vihti | 117 |
| Kemi | 107 |
| Parainen | 97 |
| Iisalmi | 94 |
| Kauniainen | 87 |
| Sipoo | 86 |
| Kangasala | 84 |
| Mariehamn | 84 |
| Suomussalmi | 77 |
| Lempäälä | 76 |
| Ylitornio | 76 |
| Riihimäki | 72 |
| Uusikaupunki | 65 |
| Lieto | 62 |
| Nykarleby | 58 |
| Outokumpu | 57 |
| Varkaus | 55 |
| Nokia | 51 |
| Ylöjärvi | 50 |
| Heinävesi | 47 |
| Loviisa | 45 |
| Karkkila | 44 |
| Naantali | 42 |
| Heinola | 41 |
| Jämsä | 41 |
| Kronoby | 40 |
| Hollola | 37 |
| Janakkala | 37 |
| Mäntsälä | 36 |
| Kuusamo | 35 |
| Pieksämäki | 34 |
| Pedersöre | 33 |
| Loimaa | 32 |
| Valkeakoski | 31 |
| Imatra | 30 |
| Laitila | 26 |
| Tervola | 26 |
| Pudasjärvi | 25 |
| Savonlinna | 24 |
| Korsholm | 23 |
| Luoto | 22 |
| Ylivieska | 21 |
| Raahe | 20 |
| Äänekoski | 20 |
| Jomala | 19 |
| Sastamala | 19 |
| Hanko | 17 |
| Lieksa | 17 |
| Akaa | 16 |
| Mänttä-Vilppula | 16 |
| Närpiö | 16 |
| Kauhava | 15 |
| Orimattila | 15 |
| Eura | 14 |
| Huittinen | 14 |
| Kankaanpää | 14 |
| Kempele | 13 |
| Rautalampi | 12 |
| Sodankylä | 12 |
| Tammela | 12 |
| Hattula | 11 |
| Kittilä | 11 |
| Liperi | 11 |
| Kemijärvi | 10 |

== Society ==
The majority of Finnish Arabs have arrived as refugees and have lived in Finland for less than five years. 37% of Arabs feel that they are Finnish, and 57% have experienced discrimination in the labour market. One in three Arabs lack Finnish friends.

During Helsinki New Year's Eve sexual assaults, Arabs in Facebook discussed how they could clear their reputation.

== Notable people ==
- Finnish people of Arab descent: Algerian, Bahraini, Egyptian, Emirati, Iraqi, Jordanian, Kuwaiti, Lebanese, Libyan, Mauritanian, Moroccan, Omani, Palestinian, Qatari, Saudi Arabian, Sudanese, Syrian, Tunisian, Yemeni
- Immigrants: Algerian, Bahraini, Egyptian, Emirati, Iraqi, Jordanian, Kuwaiti, Lebanese, Libyan, Mauritanian, Moroccan, Omani, Palestinian, Qatari, Saudi Arabian, Sudanese, Syrian, Tunisian, Yemeni
- Expatriates: Algerian, Bahraini, Egyptian, Emirati, Iraqi, Jordanian, Kuwaiti, Lebanese, Libyan, Mauritanian, Moroccan, Omani, Palestinian, Qatari, Saudi Arabian, Sudanese, Syrian, Tunisian Yemeni
