= Central Asian Arabic =

Endangered Arabic languages of Central Asia

- Jugari Arabic
- Native to: Afghanistan, Iran, Tajikistan, Uzbekistan
- Ethnicity: Central Asian Arabs
- Speakers: (16,000 cited 1992–2023)
- Language family: Afro-Asiatic: Semitic; West Semitic; Central Semitic; Arabic; Central Asian Arabic
- Dialects: Bactrian; Bukharian; Kashkadarian; Khorasani

Language codes
- ISO 639-3: Either: abh – Tajiki Arabic auz – Uzbeki Arabic
- Glottolog: cent2410
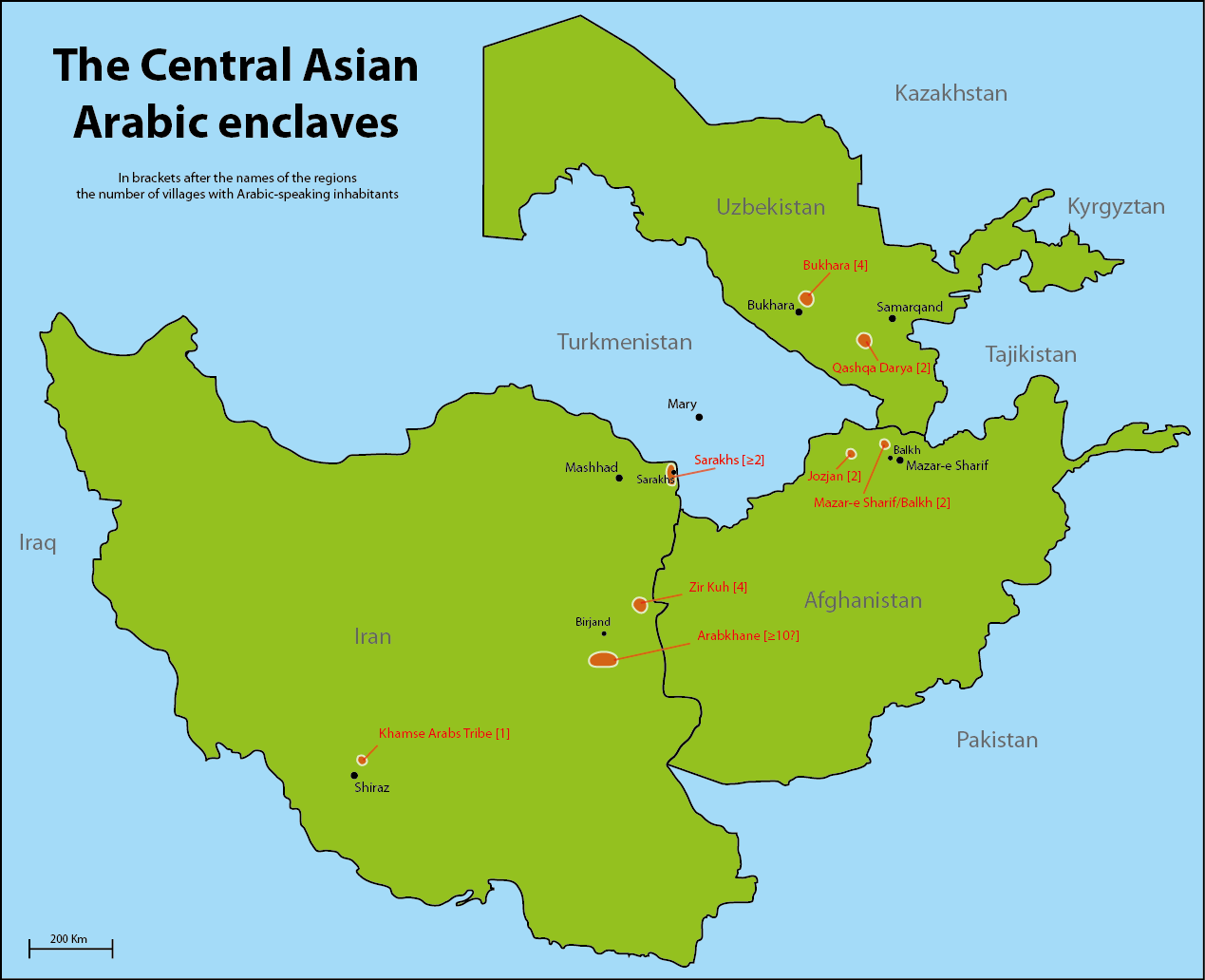
- Enclaves in Afghanistan, Iran and Uzbekistan where Central Asian Arabic is still spoken. In brackets, after the name of each region, is the number of villages with Arabic-speaking inhabitants.

- Central Asian Arabic is classified as Definitely Endangered by the UNESCO Atlas of the World's Languages in Danger

Central Asian Arabic or Jugari Arabic (Arabic: العربية الآسيوية الوسطى) refers to a set of four closely related varieties of Arabic currently facing extinction and spoken predominantly by Arab communities living in portions of Central Asia. These varieties are Bactrian (or Bakhtāri/Baxtāri) Arabic, Bukharan (or Bukhāri/Buxāri) Arabic, Qashqa Darya (or Kashka-darya) Arabic, and Khorasani (or Xorasāni) Arabic.

The Central Asian Arabic varieties are markedly different from all other Arabic language varieties, especially in their syntax and to a lesser extent, morphology, which have been heavily influenced by the surrounding Western Iranian and Turkic languages. They are, however, relatively conservative in their lexicon and phonology. While they bear certain similarities with North Mesopotamian Arabic, they constitute an independent linguistic branch of Arabic, the Central Asian family.

Along with Maltese and Cypriot Arabic, the Central Asian Arabic varieties are exceptional among Arabic-speaking communities in not being characterized by diglossia with Modern Standard Arabic, except in religious contexts; rather, Uzbek or Persian (including Dari and Tajik) function as the high prestige lect and literary language for these communities. Essentially all speakers are reported to be bilingual, with essentially no Jugari Arabic monolinguals remaining. Many, if not most self-identified ethnic Arabs in these communities do not speak the language at a native level, and report other languages as their mother tongues.

These varieties are spoken by an estimated 6,000 people total in Afghanistan, Iran, Tajikistan, and Uzbekistan, but declining in number; in all four of these countries, Arabic is not an official language.

== History ==
It was once spoken among Central Asia's numerous settled and nomadic Arab communities who moved there after the fall of the Sasanian Empire. They inhabited areas in Samarqand, Bukhara, Qashqadarya, Surkhandarya (present-day Uzbekistan), and Khatlon (present-day Tajikistan), as well as Afghanistan. The first wave of Arabs migrated to this region in the 8th century during the Muslim conquests and was later joined by groups of Arabs from Balkh and Andkhoy (present-day Afghanistan). According to Ibn Al-Athir, the Arabic conquerors settled about 50,000 Arabic families in to Iranian Khorasan, modern day Northern Afghanistan and southern Turkmenistan, but the number is definitely exaggerated. Arabic became the language of science and commerce of the epoch. Most Central Asian Arabs lived in isolated communities and did not favour intermarriages with the local population. This factor helped their language survive in a multilingual milieu until the 20th century. By the 1880s many Arab pastoralists had migrated to northern Afghanistan from what is now Uzbekistan and Tajikistan following the Russian conquest of Central Asia. These Arabs nowadays speak no Arabic, having adapted to Dari and Uzbek.

With the establishment of the Soviet rule in Uzbekistan and Tajikistan, Arab communities faced major linguistic and identity changes having had to abandon nomadic lifestyles and gradually mixing with Uzbeks, Tajiks and Turkmen. According to the 1959 census, only 34% of Soviet Arabs, mostly elderly, spoke their language at a native level. Others reported Uzbek or Tajik as their mother tongue.

== Varieties ==
Giorgi Tsereteli and Isaak Natanovich Vinnikov were responsible for the first academic studies of Central Asian Arabic, which is heavily influenced by the local languages in phonetics, vocabulary and syntax.

The Jugari Arabic comprises four varieties: Bactrian Arabic (also called Bakhtari Arabic), Bukhara Arabic (also called Buxara Arabic), Kashkadarya Arabic and Khorasani Arabic. The first three have their speakers spread across Afghanistan, Tajikistan and Uzbekistan. Khorasani came to be considered by scholars as part of the Central Asian Arabic dialect family only recently.

It is reported to be spoken in 5 villages of Surkhandarya, Qashqadarya and Bukhara. In Uzbekistan, there are at least two dialects of Central Asian Arabic: Bukharian (influenced by Tajik) and Qashqadaryavi (influenced by Turkic languages). These dialects are not mutually intelligible. In Tajikistan, Central Asian Arabic is spoken by 35.7% of the country's Arab population, having been largely replaced by Tajik. Bactrian Arabic is spoken in Arab communities in northern Afghanistan. Recent studies considered Khorasani Arabic (spoken in Khorasan, Iran) as part of the Central Asian Arabic family, and found that it was closely related to Qashqadaryavi.

== Numbers ==
- wahid > fad (one)
- ithnaân > isnen (two)
- thalatha > salaâs (three)
- arba’a > orba’ (four)

== See also ==
- History of Arabs in Afghanistan
- Khoja
- Central Asian Arabs

== Bibliography ==
- Versteegh, Kees (2014). The Arabic Language. Edinburgh University Press. ISBN 9780748645282.
- Юшманов Н. В. (1931). "Арабское наречие советского востока" [The Arabic dialect of the Soviet Orient] (PDF). In Владимирцов, Б.Я. (ed.). Культура и письменность Востока (in Russian). Vol. 10. Мoscow: Издание Всесоюзного Центрального Комитета Нового Алфавита при Президиуме ЦИК СССР.
