= Iraq–Yugoslavia relations =

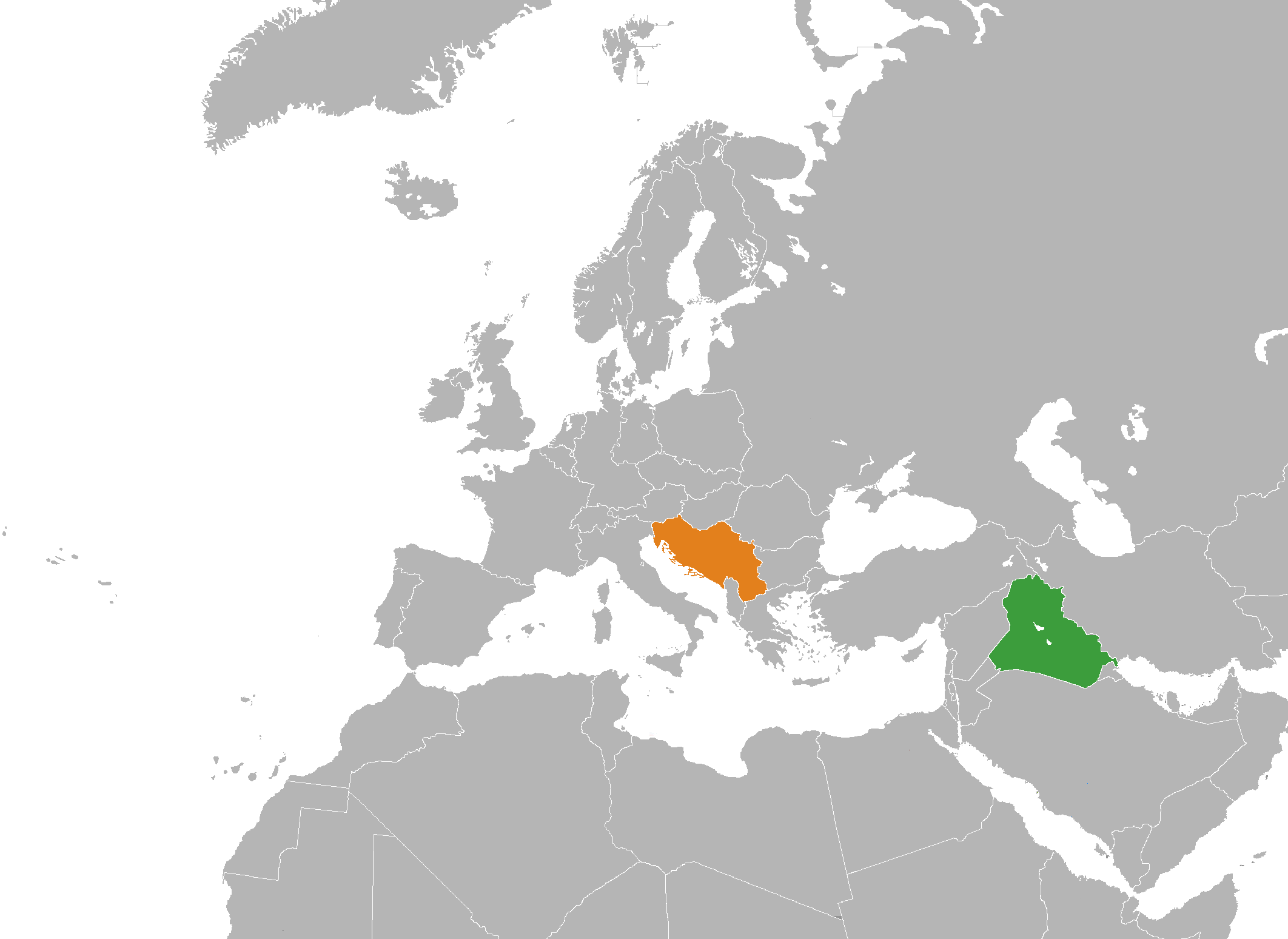

- Iraq: Yugoslavia

Iraq–Yugoslavia relations were historical foreign relations between Iraq and the former Yugoslavia. Iraq established diplomatic relations with the Socialist Federal Republic of Yugoslavia in 1958. Josip Broz Tito visited Iraq in August 1967 and again in February 1979.

Yugoslavia became a major arms exporter to Iraq under Saddam Hussein and provided weapons to Iraq during the Iran–Iraq War. Yugoslav foreign policy, with its prominent role in the Non-Aligned Movement, perceived the Iran–Iraq War to be highly delicate issue due to conflicting national and multilateral interests and values. Yugoslav Federal Secretary of Foreign Affairs became unusually silent on the issue as it was clear to Belgrade that Iraq was the aggressor but due to pressure from the Yugoslav People's Army circles was not ready to condemn Saddam Hussein. At the time Iraq was the biggest Yugoslav trade partner in the Third World. Yugoslavia also sent engineers to Iraq during the 1980s to construct numerous bunkers for the Iraqi regime which would be used during the Gulf War.

== Bilateral relations ==
- 2 October 1958: Trade and Cooperation Agreement between SFRY and Iraq. Into force: 19 February 1959
- 14 June 1974: Agreement on Economic and Technical Cooperation between the SFRY and the Republic of Iraq. Into force: 18 June 1975
- 28 February 1980: Consular Convention between the Socialist Federal Republic of Yugoslavia and the Republic of Iraq. Into force: 10 April 1981

== Economic cooperation ==
Yugoslavia developed significant economic cooperation with Mediterranean and other Arab Non-Aligned countries including Iraq. At its peak, mutual trade between the two countries reached 4 billion US dollar. Yugoslav companies built the Umm Qasr Port, the only Iraqi deep water port. They were also engaged for the construction of the Weapons factory in the vicinity of Yusufiyah. At the time of the beginning of Iran-Iraq War some 100,000 Yugoslav workers had to leave the country.

== See also ==
- Foreign relations of Iraq
- Foreign relations of Yugoslavia
- Iraq–Serbia relations
