= Central Asian Arabs =

Regions with significant populations
- Central Asia (Afghanistan, Uzbekistan, Tajikistan, Turkmenistan, Iranian Khorasan)

Languages
- Central Asian Arabic, Persian (Farsi, Tajiki, Dari), Uzbek, Turkmen, Russian

Religion
- Sunni Islam

Related ethnic groups
- Other Arabs

Central Asian Arabs (Arabic: عرب آسيا الوسطى) refers to ethnic Arabs from Central Asia. The total number of entrenched Arabs in Central Asia is no more than 10,000 people, including over 4,000 in Tajikistan (2010 census) and in Uzbekistan 2,800 people (1989 census). In Turkmenistan, the traditional place of settlement of Arabs was the vicinity of the cities Türkmenabat and Dänew.

== Language ==
The native language of Central Asian Arabs is Central Asian Arabic. They also speak the majority language of their country and Russian. There are 4 dialects, Bakhtiari (بختياري), Qashqadaryawi (قشقدارياوي), Bukhari (بخاري), and Khorasani (خراساني). Bakhtiari is spoken in Afghanistan, Bukhari is spoken in Tajikistan, Qashqadaryawi and Bukhari are spoken in Uzbekistan, and Khorasani Arabic is spoken in Northeast Iran. Qashqadaryawi is named after Qashqadaryo Region and has Uzbek influences, Bukhari is named after Bukhara Region and has Persian influences, while Bakhtiari is named after Bactria. In Uzbekistan, Qashqadaryawi and Bukhari are not exclusive to Qashqadaryo or Bukhara and are spoken by Arab communities countrywide, although they often speak Russian or Uzbek to each other, as their dialects are not mutually intelligible.

== History ==
Arab settlers came to Central Asia in several waves between the 7th and 17th centuries. The first wave was during the 7th-8th centuries, after Arab Muslim troops conquered Central Asia, they set up large garrisons in the main cities of the Bukhara and Samarkand region. Chronicles showed that in Bukhara, Arab soldiers settled half of the houses and lands of local residents. Some Arabs retained their culture, while some were assimilated into the Iranic and Turkic population. In Turkmenistan, Arabs mainly live in the vicinity of the cities of Türkmenabat and Dänew. Arabs had a history migrating to Afghanistan in many waves starting in the 7th century, where they either settled in Afghanistan or moved to other Central Asian lands. Many Central Asian Arabs migrated to Afghanistan following the Russian conquest of Central Asia.

In the 2010 census, there was 4 thousand Arabs in Tajikistan. For a long time, Arab women were not allowed to marry a non-Arab man, while Arab men were free to marry Tajik or Uzbek women. The government of Emomali Rahmon had good relations with the Arabs of Tajikistan, therefore the Arabs took the side of Rahmon during the Tajikistani Civil War. There was also an ethnic conflict between Arabs and Karategin Uzbeks, which escalated into clashes where people were killed and families were expelled from their homes.

According to the 1989 census, 12,880 Arabs were registered in Uzbekistan. The Arabic dialect of Qashqadaryo has much more similarities with Classical Arabic than the Bukhara dialect, which is more Persianised. In the Samarkand region, the cultural capital of Arabs was the village of Vedar. Bukhari is spoken by residents of the villages of Jargari, Chagdaryo, Shokhanbeg, Gijduvon, Bukhara, as well as the Arabkhana village of Vobkent District, while Qashqadaryawi is spoken in the villages of Dzhenau, Qamashi, Beshkent, and in the north-west of Qarshi.
