= Name of Afghanistan =

The name Afghānistān (Dari: افغانستان, Afġānistān Dari pronunciation: [afɣɑnɪsˈtʰɑn]; Pashto: افغانستان Afġānistān Pashto pronunciation: [avɣɒnisˈtɒn, abɣɒnisˈtɒn] (Note: The phoneme [f] ف occurs only in loanwords in Pashto, it tends to be replaced with [p] پ. [b] is also an allophone of [p] before voiced consonants; [v] is an allophone of [f] before voiced consonants in loanwords.)) means "land of the Afghans", the name "Afghan" originally referred to a member of the Pashtuns. which originates from the ethnonym Afghan. Historically, Pashtuns were referred to as Afghans, the largest ethnic group of Afghanistan. The earliest reference to the name is found in the 10th-century geography book known as Hudud al-'Alam. (Note: the reference to the final form modern name 'Afghan', not the name 'Afghanistan'.) The last part of the name, -stān is a Persian suffix for "place".

In the early 19th century, Afghan politicians adopted the name Afghanistan for the entire Durrani Empire after its English translation had already appeared in various treaties with Qajarid Persia and British India. The first time the word Afghanistan was officially used was during signing of Treaty of Gandamak, after defeat of Afghan Emir Yaqoob Khan during Second Anglo-Afghan War.

== Afghan dynasties ==
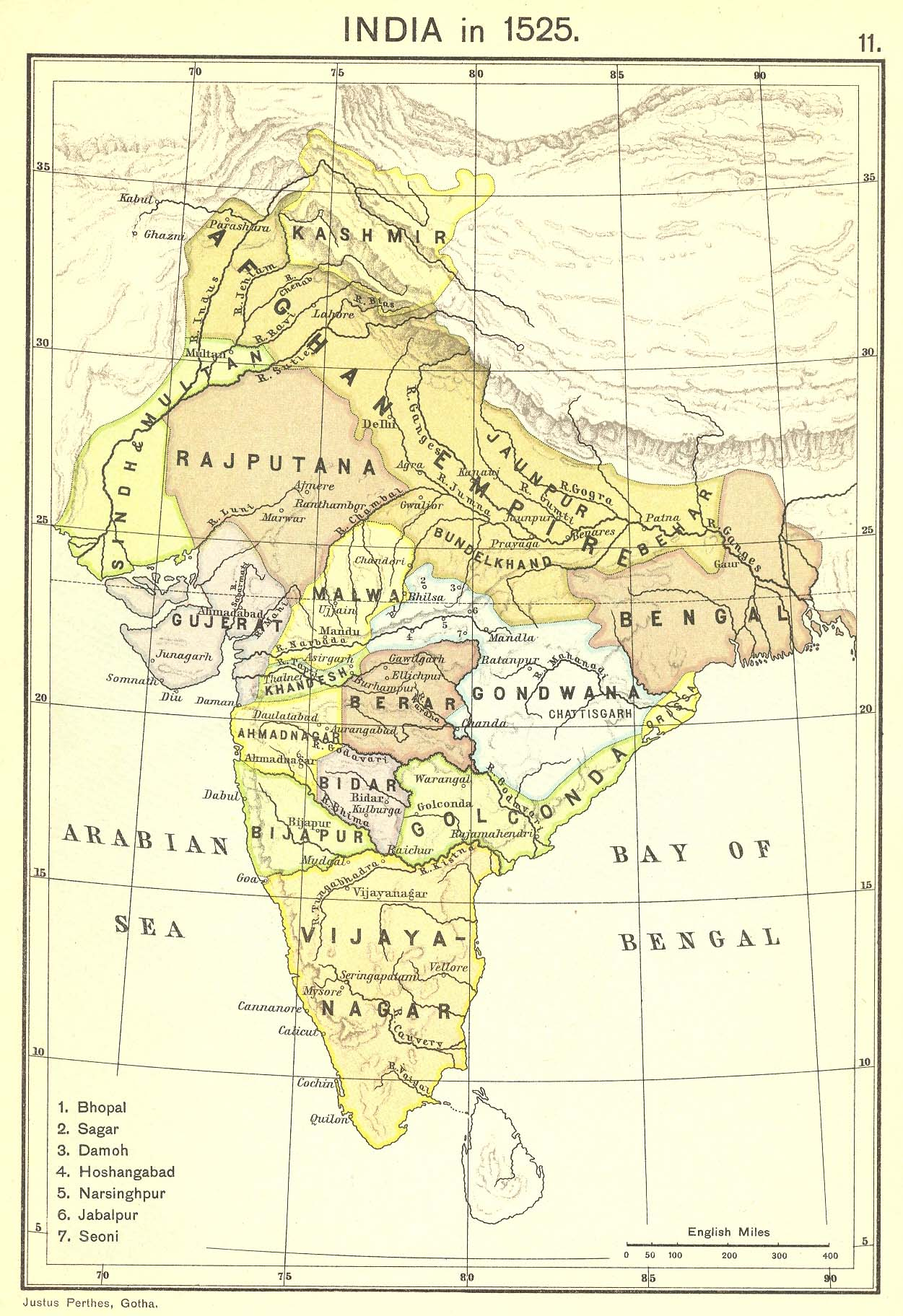
The Afghan Lodi dynasty of North India

According to Ta'rikh-i Yamini (author being secretary of Mahmud of Ghazni), Afghans enrolled in Sabuktigin's Ghaznavid Empire in the 10th century as well as in the later Ghurid Kingdom (1148–1215). From the beginning of the Turko-Afghan Khalji dynasty in 1290, Afghans are becoming more recognized in history among the Delhi Sultanate of India. The later Lodi dynasty and Sur Empire of Delhi were both made up of Afghans, whose rule stretched to as far as what is now Bangladesh in the east. Other Afghan dynasties emerged during the 18th century, namely the Hotak dynasty and the Durrani Empire which covered huge swathes of Central and South Asia.

== Early references to Afghanistan ==
The word Afghan is mentioned in the form of Abgan in the third century CE by the Sassanians and as Avagana (Afghana) in the 6th century CE by Indian astronomer Varahamihira. A people called the Afghans are mentioned several times in a 10th-century geography book, Hudud al-'Alam, particularly where a reference is made to a village: "Saul, a pleasant village on a mountain. In it live Afghans."

Al-Biruni referred to them in the 11th century as various tribes living on the western frontier mountains of the Indus River. Ibn Battuta, a famous Maghrebi scholar visiting the region in 1333, writes: "We travelled on to Kabul, formerly a vast town, the site of which is now occupied by a village inhabited by a tribe of Persians called Afghans. They hold mountains and defiles and possess considerable strength, and are mostly highwaymen. Their principle mountain is called Kuh Sulayman."

Some of the earliest mentions of the term Afghanistan can be found in the 9th century History of the House of Artsruni by Armenian historian Tovma Artsruni (as Ապղաստան [Apłastan]) and the 13th century Tarikh nama-i-Herat of Sayf ibn Muhammad ibn Yaqub al-Herawi, mentioning it as a country between Khorasan and Hind, paying tributes to the country of Shamsuddin.

Furthermore the name "Afghanistan" is mentioned in writing by the 16th-century Mughal ruler Babur, referring to a territory south of Kabulistan.

The road from Khorasān leads by way of Kandahār. It is a straight level road, and does not go through any hill-passes.... In the country of Kābul there are many and various tribes. Its valleys and plains are inhabited by Tūrks, Aimāks, and Arabs. In the city and the greater part of the villages, the population consists of Tājiks* (Sarts). Many other of the villages and districts are occupied by Pashāis, Parāchis, Tājiks, Berekis, and Afghans. In the hill-country to the west, reside the Hazāras and Nukderis. Among the Hazāra and Nukderi tribes, there are some who speak the Moghul language. In the hill-country to the north-east lies Kaferistān, such as Kattor and Gebrek. To the south is Afghanistān.

— Babur, 1525

The name "Afghanistan" is also mentioned many times in the writings of the 16th-century historian, Muhammad Qasim Hindu Shah (Ferishta), and many others.

The men of Kábul and Khilj also went home; and whenever they were questioned about the Musulmáns of the Kohistán (the mountains), and how matters stood there, they said, 'Don't call it Kohistán, but Afghánistán; for there is nothing there but Afgháns and disturbances.' Thus it is clear that for this reason the people of the country call their home in their own language Afghánistán, and themselves Afgháns. The people of India call them Patán; but the reason for this is not known. But it occurs to me, that when, under the rule of Muslims, they first came to the city of Patná, and dwelt there, the people of India (for that reason) called them Patáns—but God knows!

— Ferishta, 1560-1620

From a imperial register detailing letters of the Ottoman Sultan Mustafa III to Ahmad Shāh Durrānī, the realm where Ahmad Shah started his reign is called as "Afghanistan" while still referring to the Durrani Empire itself as the "Afghan Sultanate".

sent by Aḥmad Shāh, through the intermediary of ʿAlī Shāh, the governor of Baghdad, to the Sublime Porte; with the commencement of sovereignty in Afghanistan, showing the evil eye (i.e. inflicting harm) upon the infidels who hold domination in Hindustan, [and] uprooting the root of the Magians. (Note: "Magians" here is a polemical designation for Dharmic-Polytheist peoples)

— Ottoman abstract, Evâsıt‑ı C. Sene 1176 (28 December–6 January 1762–63)

In the travel account of George Forster, an English traveller, written during the reign of Timur Shah Durrani, and published during the reign of Zaman Shah Durrani, the Durrani Empire is referred to as 'Afghaniſtan' by identifying Kandahar as the designed capital of Afghanistan built by Ahmad Shah, while areas beyond the Indus are referred to as foreign possessions. Timur Shah is also referred to as the Prince of Afghanistan.

The coined term of Afghanistan came into place in 1855, officially recognized by the British during the reign of Dost Mohammad Khan while he was forging his campaigns to re-unite Afghanistan following its 70 year civil war with the Barakzai-Durrani feud following the execution of Wazir Fateh Khan Barakzai.

== Last Afghan empire ==
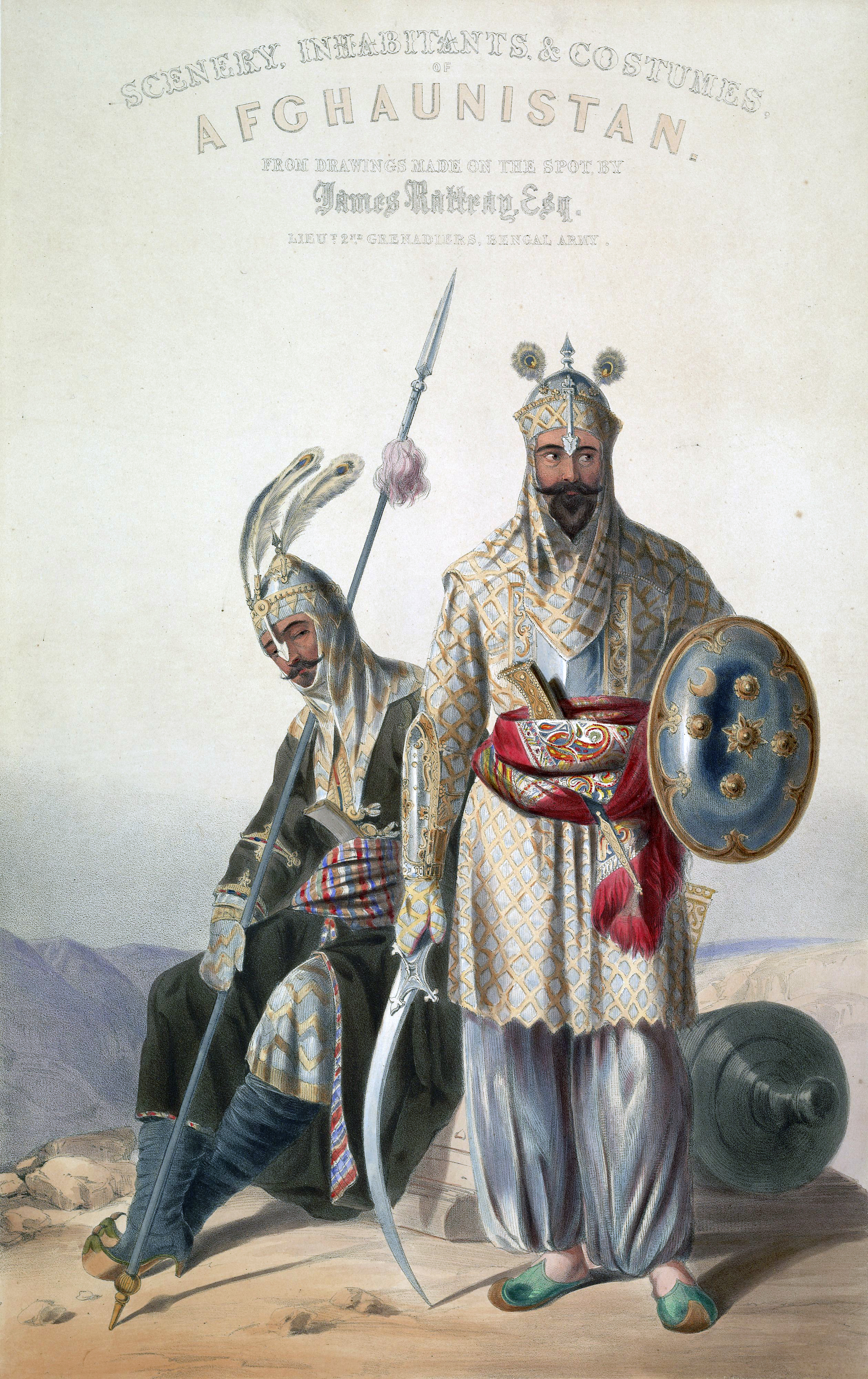
A Lithography collection made by James Rattray in the early 1800s shows the name Afghaunistan on the front cover.

Regarding the modern sovereign state of Afghanistan, Encyclopædia Britannica, Encyclopædia Iranica and others explain that the political history of Afghanistan begins in 1709 with the rise of the Hotak dynasty, which was established by Mirwais Hotak who is regarded as "Mirwais Neeka" ("Mirwais the grandfather").

The modern Afghan kingdom begins with the rise to supremacy first of the Ghalzais and shortly afterwards of the Durranis under Ahmed Shah.

— M. T. Houtsma

The Encyclopaedia of Islam states:

The country now known as Afghanistan has borne that name only since the middle of the 18th century, when the supremacy of the Afghan race became assured: previously various districts bore distinct apellations, but the country was not a definite political unit, and its component parts were not bound together by any identity of race or language. The earlier meaning of the word was simply 'the land of the Afghans', a limited territory which did not include many parts of the present state but did comprise large districts now either independent or within the boundary of British India.

— M. T. Houtsma

British India eventually became what is now Pakistan, India and Bangladesh.

== Modern names ==
Modern terms for Afghanistan and Afghan in relevant modern languages:

Language	Afghanistan	Afghan (noun)
Dari Persian	افغانستان (Afğânestân) [afɣɒːnɪstɒːn]	افغان (afğân) [afɣɒːn]
Pashto	افغانستان (Afġānistān) [afɣɑnɪstɑn]	افغان (afǧân) [afɣɑn]
Uzbek	Afgʻoniston	Afgʻon
Turkmen	Owganystan	Owganystanda
Urdu	افغانستان (Afġānistān) [əfɣaːnɪstaːn]	افغان (afġān) [əfɣaːn]
Balochi	افغانستان	
Brahui	Aoģánistán	
Kyrgyz	Ооганстан (Ooganstan)	ооган (oogan)
Arabic	أفغانستان (ʾAfḡānistān) [ʔafɣaːnistaːn]	أفغاني ʾafḡāniyy m. [ʔafɣaːnijj] أفغانية ʾafḡāniyya f. [ʔafɣaːnijja]
Chinese	阿富汗 (Āfùhàn) [á fû xân]	阿富汗人 (Āfùhànrén) [á fû xân ʐə̌n]
Hindi	अफ़ग़ानिस्तान (Afġānistān) [əfɡaːnɪstaːn]	अफ़्ग़ान (afġān) [əfɡaːn]
Punjabi	ਅਫ਼ਗ਼ਾਨਿਸਤਾਨ / افغانستان (Aphagānīstān)	
Russian	Афганистан (Afganistan) [ɐvɡənʲɪˈstan]	афганец (afganets) m. [ɐvˈɡanʲɪt͡s] афганка (afganka) f. [ɐvˈɡankə]
Tajik	Афғонистон (Afġoniston) [afɣɔːnistɔːn]	афғон (afġon) [afɣɔːn]
Uyghur	ئافغانىستان (Afghanistan)	

== See also ==
- List of country-name etymologies
- History of Afghanistan
- Names of Khyber Pakhtunkhwa
- Pashtunistan
