= Khorasani Arabic =

Dialect of Arabs of Khorasan

- Native to: Iran
- Ethnicity: Khorasani Arabs
- Native speakers: 5,000 (2014)
- Language family: Afro-Asiatic: Semitic; West Semitic; Central Semitic; Arabic; Central Asian; Khorasani Arabic
- Writing system: Arabic alphabet

Language codes
- ISO 639-3: auz
- Glottolog: khor1274

Khorasani Arabic is a dialect of Arabic spoken in Iran. It is a variety of Central Asian Arabic spoken in a few villages in the Iranian province of Khorasan. Khorasani Arabic is not taught in school and is not widely spoken by the Khorasani Arab community.

According to Kees Versteegh, there are between 5,000 and 10,000 Khorasani Arabic speakers. Khorasani Arabic may be related to Central Asian Arabic. It is influenced by Persian.
