= Khorasani Arabs =

Descendants of Abbasid-era Arab migrations to Iran

Arabs in Khorasan عرب‌های خراسان عرب خراسان
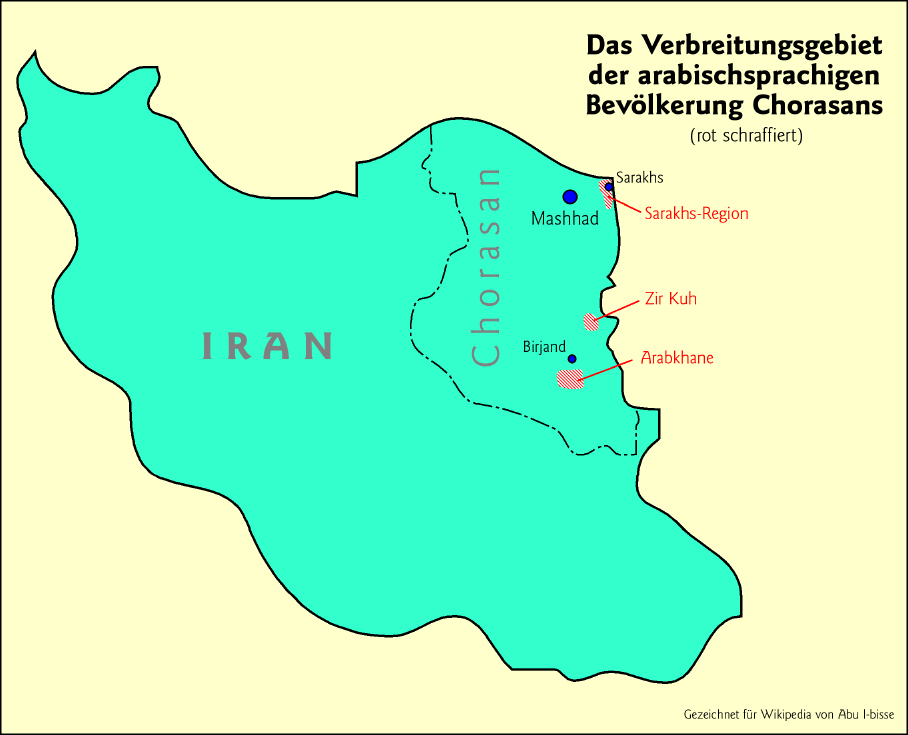

Total population
- 50,000 (2013)

Regions with significant populations
- South Khorasan; Razavi Khorasan

Languages
- Persian, Arabic (Khorasani Arabic)

Religion
- Shia Islam, minority Sunni Islam

Related ethnic groups
- Iranian Arabs

Khorasani Arabs are Iranian Arabs who are descended from the Arabs who immigrated to the Khorasan area of Iran during the Abbasid Caliphate (750−1258). Unlike the Khuzestani Arabs of Iran's Khuzestan Province in the southwestern part of the country, who are direct descendants of more recent 18th century migrants into the area, the Khorasani Arabs are descended from Arab migrants in the Middle Ages. According to a 2013 article in the peer-reviewed journal Iran and the Caucasus, the Khorasani Arabs number c. 50,000 and are "already almost totally Persianised".

Most Khorasani Arabs belong to the tribes of Shaybani, Zangooyi, Mishmast, Khozaima, and Azdi. Khorasan Arabs are Persian speakers, and only a few speak Khorasani Arabic as their native language. The cities of Birjand, Mashhad, and Nishapur are home to large groups of Khorasani Arabs.

According to Ibn Al-Athir, the Abbasids settled about 50,000 Arab families in Iranian Khorasan, modern day Northern Afghanistan and southern Turkmenistan, but the number is definitely exaggerated.

== Notable people ==
- Abu al-Futuh al-Razi (b. 1077 CE) – early 12th century Twelver Shia Muslim theologian and author descended from the tribe of Banu Khuza'ah in Nishapur
- Qahtaba ibn Shabib al-Ta'i - was a follower of the Abbasids from Khurasan who played a leading role in the Abbasid Revolution against the Umayyad Caliphate.

== See also ==
- Iranian Arabs
- Khorasani Arabic

== Sources ==
- Persian and German Wikipedia
- Linguistic Convergence and Areal Diffusion: Case Studies from Iranian. By Éva Ágnes Csató, Bo Isaksson, Carina Jahani. Page 162.
- Khorasani Arabic
