= Amjad Migati =

Serbian politician of Jordanian descent

- Born: April 27, 1951 (age 75); Jordan
- Occupations: Politician, journalist

Amjad Migati (Serbian Cyrillic: Амџад Мигати; born April 27, 1951) is a Serbian politician of Jordanian descent, who is the first foreign-born citizen to become a deputy in the National Assembly. Migati was born and raised in Jordan, but came to study in Yugoslavia in the 1960s and married an ethnic Serb woman, with whom he has three children. In 1990, he settled permanently in Serbia, and became a journalist in the Serbian press. He joined the Serbian Radical Party under Vojislav Šešelj in the 1990s, and became a close friend with him. Migati has stated his political positions are strongly anti-globalist and is a Serb nationalist.
