= Iraq–Serbia relations =

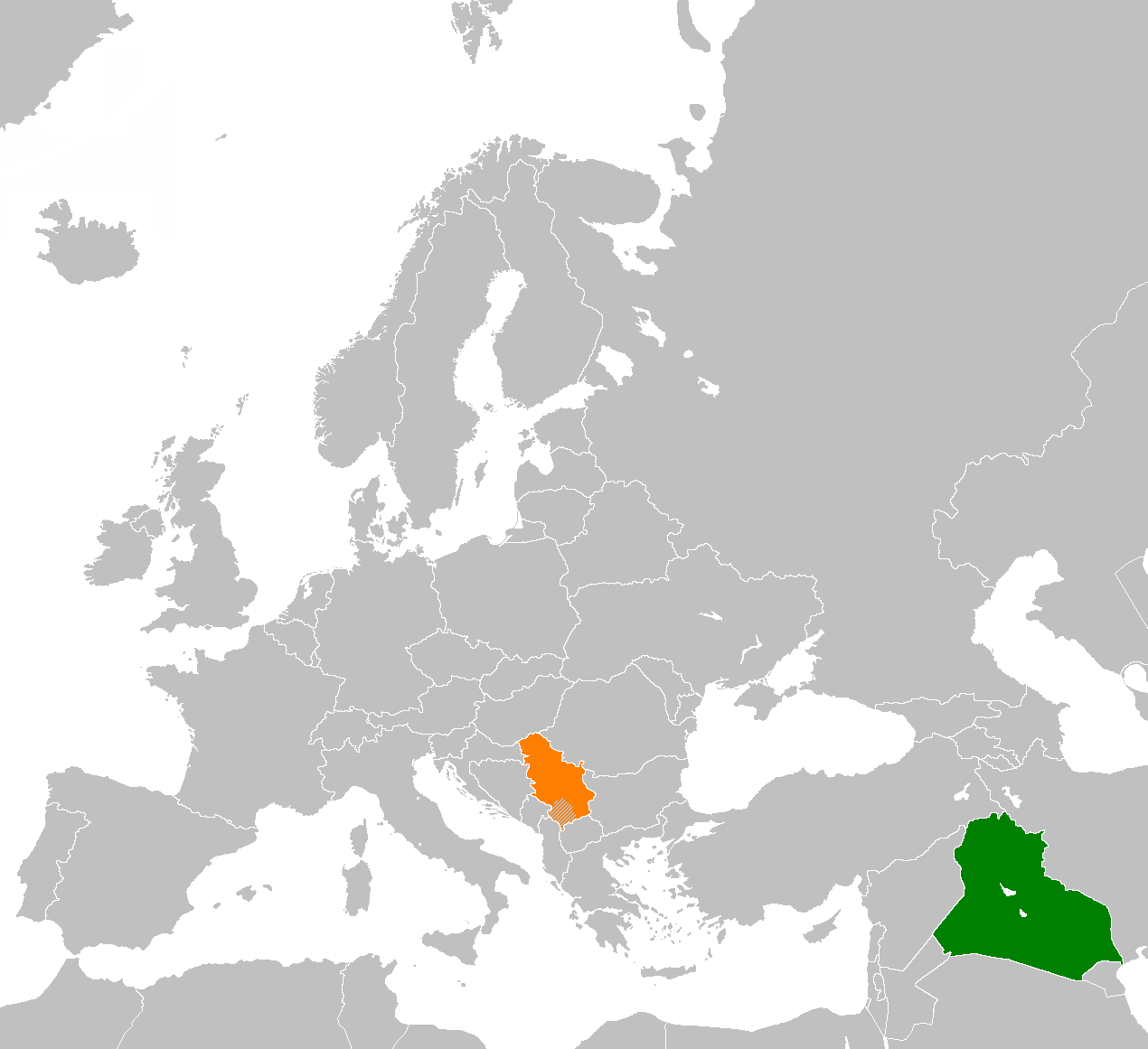
- Iraq: Serbia

Iraq and Serbia maintain diplomatic relations established between Iraq and SFR Yugoslavia in 1958. From 1958 to 2006, Iraq maintained relations with the Socialist Federal Republic of Yugoslavia (SFRY) and the Federal Republic of Yugoslavia (FRY) (later Serbia and Montenegro), of which Serbia is considered shared (SFRY) or sole (FRY) legal successor.

== History ==
=== Establishment of relations and early cooperation (1958–1979) ===
Iraq and Yugoslavia established diplomatic relations in 1958, the same year the 14 July Revolution brought a republican government to power in Baghdad. The relationship was grounded partly in the framework of the Non-Aligned Movement (NAM), to which both countries were founding contributors. Yugoslavia's President Josip Broz Tito co-founded the NAM in Belgrade in 1961, and Iraq was among the 25 nations that participated in that inaugural Belgrade Conference, alongside Afghanistan, India, Egypt, Ghana, Indonesia, and others — cementing a shared commitment to independence from Cold War power blocs.

Tito visited Iraq in August 1967 and again in February 1979, reinforcing personal ties between the two leaderships at the highest level. Alongside these high-level visits, a Trade and Cooperation Agreement between the SFRY and Iraq entered into force on 19 February 1959. This was followed by an Agreement on Economic and Technical Cooperation signed on 14 June 1974 (in force 18 June 1975), and a Consular Convention signed on 28 February 1980 (in force 10 April 1981).

Yugoslavia developed significant economic cooperation with Mediterranean and Arab Non-Aligned countries, of which Iraq was the most important. At its peak, bilateral trade between the two countries reached 4 billion US dollars, making Iraq Yugoslavia's largest trade partner in the developing world. Yugoslav construction companies were active in Iraq from an early period, notably building the Umm Qasr Port — Iraq's only deep-water port — as well as a weapons factory in the vicinity of Yusufiyah, which was later captured by Al-Qaeda-affiliated militants following the 2003 invasion of Iraq. Beginning in the 1960s, hundreds of Iraqi students also studied in Yugoslavia, establishing strong educational and cultural ties between the two peoples.

=== Yugoslav relations with Ba'ath-era Iraq ===
Yugoslavia established a large engineering and technology presence in Iraq soon after Saddam Hussein came to power. Yugoslav engineers were dispatched to Iraq during the 1970s and 1980s to construct an extensive network of underground bunkers for the Iraqi regime, structures that would be used both during the Gulf War and again during the US-led invasion of 2003.

=== Iran–Iraq War and the exodus of Yugoslav workers (1980–1988) ===
During the Iran–Iraq War (1980–1988), Yugoslavia became a significant arms exporter to Iraq under Saddam Hussein. At the time of the outbreak of hostilities, approximately 100,000 Yugoslav workers were employed in Iraq and had to leave the country when the war began.

Yugoslav foreign policy, with its prominent role in the Non-Aligned Movement, regarded the conflict as a highly delicate matter. The Yugoslav Federal Secretary of Foreign Affairs became notably cautious on the issue: while it was apparent to Belgrade that Iraq had acted as the aggressor, pressure from circles within the Yugoslav People's Army made the government unwilling to publicly condemn Saddam Hussein. This ambivalence reflected the weight of Iraq as Yugoslavia's most important Third World trade partner at the time.

=== Sanctions era and covert military cooperation (1990s–2002) ===
In the 1990s both Yugoslavia (under Slobodan Milošević) and Iraq (under Saddam Hussein) found themselves isolated under heavy international sanctions, a common predicament that drew the two regimes into closer alignment. Scholars have noted that the parallel status of the two governments as international pariahs, both fighting for survival against what they perceived as a common Western adversary, fostered a pattern of cooperation that went beyond ordinary bilateral ties.

One of the first major covert agreements under sanctions was negotiated in summer 1993, during a secret visit to Baghdad by Serbia's Army Chief of Staff. The arrangement centred on delivering Iraqi oil in exchange for Yugoslav military goods and services. Exports of aircraft, missiles, chemicals, and other military equipment, as well as maintenance contracts, continued through autumn 2002 and were organized by Yugoimport SDPR, a government-controlled arms company. Serbian Interior Minister Dušan Mihajlović served as Chairman of the Board of Directors of Yugoimport SDPR, with Federal Interior Minister Zoran Živković also serving on its board. International investigators later determined that these transactions may have assisted Saddam Hussein's efforts to develop a primitive cruise missile and to maintain or develop chemical weapons capabilities, in addition to supporting Iraq's conventional air defence and artillery.

In the same period, Yugoimport SDPR designed and built the Ba'ath party headquarters in Baghdad along with an additional five underground bunkers for Saddam Hussein. The blueprints of these bunkers were considered significant enough that they were handed over to the United States when the invasion began, as Saddam and loyalists sheltered in them during the United States invasion.

Notably, arms transfers to Iraq persisted even after the fall of Milošević in October 2000. Investigations by the International Crisis Group found that transactions with Iraq continued under the subsequent administrations of President Vojislav Koštunica and Prime Minister Zoran Đinđić, with top officials including the Defence Minister and Chief of the General Staff either aware of the sales or in a position to have known. The continued violation of UN sanctions on Iraq was ultimately resolved by Serbian authorities only after sustained diplomatic pressure from the United States.

A rumour was circulated in the media in 1999 during the NATO bombing of Yugoslavia that Yugoslav president Slobodan Milošević and Saddam Hussein had allegedly negotiated a discreet military alliance intended to improve their ability to defy the West and withstand Allied bombing attacks, with low-profile support from Russia and China.

=== Boka Star seizure (2002) ===
In 2002, a Yugoslav ship Boka Star, owned by a Montenegrin named Marko Balić was seized by the United States Navy after a tip-off that it was carrying a large weapons shipment to Iraq. Serbia and Montenegro was one of the only countries in the world to have continued military shipments to Iraq during the international sanctions regime against the Hussein government. The seizure occurred just one year before the 2003 invasion of Iraq.

=== 2003 invasion and aftermath ===
Upon the 2003 invasion of Iraq, Western military analysts referred to maps and advice from former engineers of the now-defunct Serbian company Aeroinženjering, which had built Saddam Hussein's underground bunkers and numerous airports in Iraq during the 1980s.

Following the fall of Saddam Hussein's government, analysts noted that Serbia's experience of transitioning out of international isolation after the overthrow of Milošević offered potentially relevant lessons for Iraq's post-war reconstruction. Former Yugoslav and Serbian construction companies were seen as prospective partners in rebuilding Iraq's destroyed infrastructure, given their deep historical involvement in the country's civil engineering and building sectors.

=== Kosovo issue and shared stance on sovereignty (2009–present) ===
A defining feature of contemporary Iraq–Serbia relations is Iraq's consistent refusal to recognise the unilaterally declared independence of Kosovo, which Serbia regards as an integral part of its territory. This principled alignment on issues of international law and sovereignty has been reaffirmed across successive Iraqi governments and at multiple levels of diplomatic contact.

On 18 February 2010, following a meeting with Iraqi Prime Minister Nouri al-Maliki, Serbian Foreign Minister Vuk Jeremić publicly stated that Serbia strongly supports Iraq's territorial integrity, just as Iraq supports Serbia's.

On 6 August 2010, following a further meeting with al-Maliki, Serbian Defence Minister Dragan Šutanovac confirmed that Iraq had not recognised Kosovo's independence and continued to back Serbian sovereignty and territorial integrity.

In October 2011, Iraq's ambassador to Belgrade, Falah Abdulsada, reiterated that Iraq supports international law and had not altered its position of non-recognition of Kosovo.

=== Elevation to ambassador-level relations (2010) ===
In 2010, Serbian foreign Minister Vuk Jeremić announced after talks with Iraqi Prime Minister Nouri al-Maliki that the two countries had agreed to raise their bilateral relations to full ambassador level, and that Serbia and Iraq share a common stance on international law and issues of territorial integrity and sovereignty.

=== Defence cooperation during the war against ISIS (2015–2018) ===
In January 2015, as Iraq faced the territorial threat posed by the Islamic State (ISIS/ISIL), Serbian Ambassador Radisav Petrović met with Iraqi Defence Minister Khaled al-Obeidi in Baghdad to discuss bilateral security cooperation, including the arming and training of the Iraqi military.

In a distinct multilateral framework, in December 2017 and February 2018, Serbian military medical officers delivered a three-week training course for medical experts from Iraq's security forces at the Serbian Military Logistics Training Centre in Niš, as part of the NATO Defence Capacity Building Initiative for Iraq. The training focused on trauma stabilisation and ground-based casualty evacuation for specialists from the Iraqi Ministry of Defence, Ministry of Interior, and the Counter-Terrorism Service — the first such training initiative of its kind between the two countries.

=== Diplomatic contacts and push for high-level visits (2019) ===
In 2019, Serbian Ambassador to Iraq Uroš Balov met with Iraqi President Barham Salih at the Al-Salam Palace in Baghdad. The two sides assessed bilateral relations as extremely good, underscored the historical friendship between the two peoples, and discussed ways to improve economic cooperation and investment. President Salih conveyed greetings to the Serbian President and agreed that it was important to begin preparations for state-level visits at the earliest opportunity, noting that such a summit had not taken place for decades.

Also in 2019, Ambassador Balov met with the Deputy Head of the Department of International Organizations and Conferences at the Iraqi Ministry of Foreign Affairs, where discussions covered bilateral relations across political, cultural, economic and industrial fields, as well as mutual support for each country's candidates in international forums.

=== NAM 60th anniversary and expanded cooperation agenda (2021) ===
On 10 October 2021, Serbian President Aleksandar Vučić received Iraqi Foreign Minister Fuad Hussein at the Presidential Palace in Belgrade, during Hussein's participation in the high-level meetings marking the 60th anniversary of the Non-Aligned Movement. Vučić referenced the history of relations between Belgrade and Baghdad, expressed Serbia's support for Iraq's security and sovereignty, and conveyed appreciation for Iraq's sacrifices in the fight against terrorism. He affirmed Serbia's readiness to provide support to Iraq and to benefit from shared expertise across various fields.

The Iraqi Minister praised Serbia's stances in international forums, expressed hope for the resumption of meetings of the Iraqi-Serbian Joint Committee, and highlighted the contribution of Serbian companies to rebuilding Iraq's infrastructure destroyed during the wars against terrorism. Minister Hussein stressed Iraq's desire to expand areas of cooperation to include agriculture, health, culture, science, economics, and oil investment.

On 12 October 2021, Prime Minister Ana Brnabić also held a separate meeting with Foreign Minister Hussein on the sidelines of the same event. The two sides highlighted the importance of improving economic cooperation, and Hussein stated that Serbian companies were welcome in Iraq particularly in civil engineering, healthcare, and education. He cited Serbia's rapid construction of three new COVID-19 hospitals as an example of Serbian capacity that could benefit Iraq.

=== 65th anniversary of diplomatic relations (2023) ===
In October 2023, the two countries marked the 65th anniversary of the establishment of diplomatic relations. Serbian Prime Minister Ana Brnabić met with Speaker of the Iraqi Parliament Mohammed Al-Halbousi to discuss bilateral relations and areas of cooperation. Brnabić underscored Serbia's commitment to strengthening ties in the fields of economy, agriculture, health, and education. The Speaker highlighted the great potential for cooperation and invited Serbian companies to participate in joint projects and do business on the Iraqi market. Al-Halbousi reaffirmed Iraq's position of non-recognition of Kosovo and expressed full support for preserving Serbia's sovereignty and territorial integrity.

=== Recent diplomatic activity (2024–2025) ===
In September 2024, Serbian Ambassador Uroš Balov met with the Deputy Head of the Department of International Organizations and Conferences at the Iraqi Ministry of Foreign Affairs to discuss bilateral relations and ways of developing them across political, cultural, economic, and industrial fields, as well as coordination on candidates in international forums.

In October 2024, Serbian Ambassador Branislav Žeželj met with Iraq's Head of Europe Department, Ambassador Bakr Ahmed Al Jaff, at the Iraqi Ministry of Foreign Affairs headquarters in Baghdad. Ambassador Žeželj underlined the depth of bilateral relations and his country's commitment to developing them across multiple fields. He highlighted the importance of establishing an economic and scientific business association to expand areas of cooperation. Ambassador Al Jaff stressed the importance of developing bilateral relations at various levels, underscoring the need for Serbian companies to participate in Iraq's infrastructure development projects, including the "Development Road" project, given their extensive experience in the field.

In November 2024, Iraq's Chargé d'Affaires in Belgrade, Minister Plenipotentiary Mayada Abdullah Yassin, met with Serbian State Secretary for Political Relations Damjan Jović at the Serbian Ministry of Foreign Affairs. The meeting addressed ways to enhance bilateral cooperation across economy, trade, culture, education, agriculture, environmental protection, and clean energy sectors, as well as political coordination. The two sides discussed draft agreements and memoranda of understanding submitted by Iraq to relevant Serbian ministries. Both parties also confirmed the importance of Iraq's participation in EXPO 2027, which Serbia will host.

In February 2025, Iraq's Undersecretary for Bilateral Relations, Ambassador Mohammed Hussein Bahr Aluloom, participated in the Serbia National Day celebration held by the Serbian Embassy in Baghdad. In his address, he stressed Iraq's commitment to strengthening bilateral relations with Serbia across various fields, highlighting the profound historical ties between the two countries rooted in decades of cooperation within the Non-Aligned Movement. He called for the reactivation of the Iraqi-Serbian Joint Committee, encouraged Serbian companies to participate in Iraq's major economic projects including the Development Road, and emphasised the importance of advancing cooperation in investment and trade.

In March 2025, Iraqi Prime Minister Mohammed Shia' Al-Sudani received Serbian Ambassador Branislav Žeželj in Baghdad and accepted an official invitation to visit Belgrade from the Serbian President. Prime Minister Al-Sudani also received an invitation for Iraq to participate in EXPO 2027, which Serbia will host in May 2027. During the meeting, Al-Sudani affirmed Iraq's openness to expanding cooperation with Serbia and invited Serbian companies to invest in Iraq, particularly in infrastructure projects. He also called for enhanced coordination between the investment authorities of both countries and the establishment of an Iraqi-Serbian Business Council to bring together the private sectors of both nations.

== Military relations ==
In 2008, Serbia signed a $235 million-dollar deal to export weapons and military equipment to Iraq. The deal included the delivery of 20 Utva Lasta trainer aircraft to the Iraqi Air Force, all of which were delivered by early 2012.

In 2015, amid Iraq's ongoing conflict with ISIS, Serbian Ambassador Radisav Petrović met with Iraqi Defence Minister Khaled al-Obeidi in Baghdad to discuss bilateral security cooperation, including arming and training of the Iraqi armed forces.

In 2017, Serbian military medical experts delivered training to Iraqi security force personnel at the Serbian Military Logistics Training Centre in Niš, under the framework of the NATO Defence Capacity Building Initiative for Iraq. This was a follow-on to a preceding training initiative held in Germany in November of the same year. The course focused on trauma stabilisation and ground-based casualty evacuation skills for specialists from the Iraqi Ministry of Defence, Ministry of Interior, and the Counter-Terrorism Service.

== Economic relations ==
Economic cooperation between the two countries has primarily taken the form of bilateral trade and Serbian civil engineering and construction activity in Iraq. According to the Serbian Ministry of Foreign Affairs, in 2019 the value of Serbia's exports to Iraq amounted to approximately 9.7 million euros, while imports from Iraq totalled around 413 million euros, representing a significant trade deficit on Serbia's side.

Both governments have repeatedly expressed a desire to expand and deepen the economic relationship. The Serbian government has pointed to the IT sector and construction industry as areas where Serbia could offer particular value to Iraq, while the Iraqi side has consistently called for Serbian companies to participate in large-scale infrastructure development, including the ambitious Development Road project. In 2025, Iraqi Prime Minister Al-Sudani called for the establishment of an Iraqi-Serbian Business Council to institutionalise private-sector cooperation between the two countries.

== Resident diplomatic missions ==
- Iraq has an embassy in Belgrade.
- Serbia has an embassy in Baghdad.

== See also ==
- Foreign relations of Iraq
- Foreign relations of Serbia
- Iraq–Yugoslavia relations
- Yugoslavia and the Non-Aligned Movement
