= Afghan (ethnonym) =

Historic term for ethnic Pashtun people

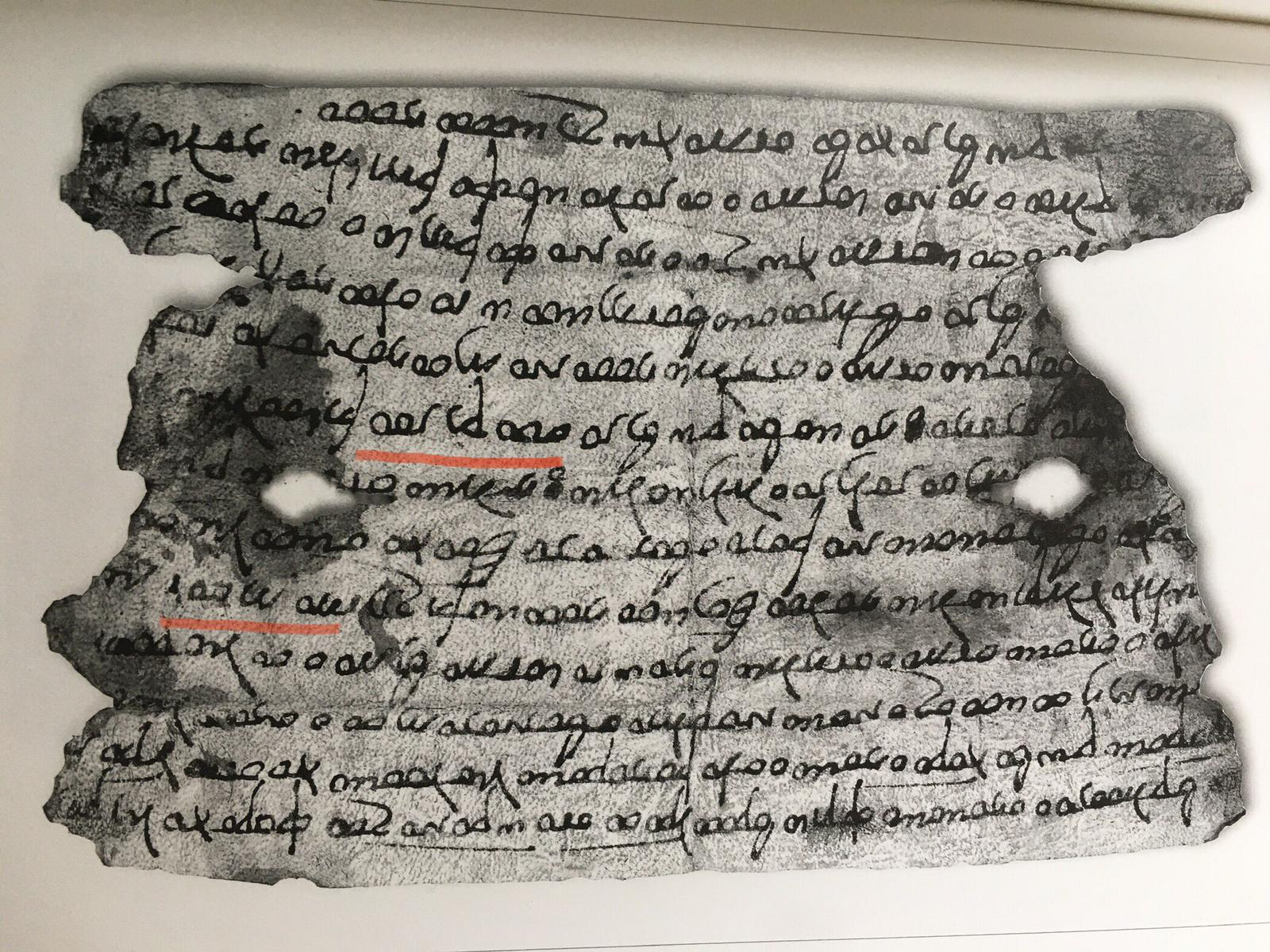
Bactrian document in the Greek script from the 4th century mentioning the word Afghan (αβγανανο): "From Ormuzd Bunukan to Bredag Watanan, the chief of the Afghans."

Afghan (Pashto: افغان) is an ethnonym historically used to refer to Pashtuns. Since the second half of the twentieth century, the term has evolved into a demonym for all residents of Afghanistan, including those outside the Pashtun ethnicity.

== Mentions ==
The earliest mention of the name Afghan (Abgân) is by Shapur I of the Sassanid Empire in the 3rd century CE. In the 4th century, the word "Afghans/Afghana" (αβγανανο) was used to refer to a particular people, as mentioned in the Bactrian documents.

"because [you] (pl.), the clan of the Afghans, said thus to me: ... And you should not have denied (?) the men of Rob [that] the Afghans took (away) the horses."

— Bactrian documents, 4th century, Sims-Williams 2007b, pp. 90-91.

Brihat-samhita, a 6th-century CE Indian encyclopedia, refers to a people called "Avagāṇa" [अवगाण], which is presumed by some to be an earlier iteration of "Afghan."

"It would be unfavourable to the people of Chola, the Afghans (Avagāṇa), the white Huns and the Chinese."

— Varāha Mihira, 6th century CE, chapt. 11, verse 61.

The word appeared again in the 982 CE Ḥudūd al-ʿĀlam, referring to the residents of the village of Saul, which is estimated to have been located near Gardez, Afghanistan. The text also refers to a kind in Ninhar (Nangarhar) who had Muslim, Afghan, and Hindu wives.

In the 11th century, Afghans are mentioned in al-Biruni's Tarikh-ul Hind ("History of the Indus"), which describes groups of rebellious Afghans in the tribal lands west of the Indus River in what is now known as Pakistan.

Al-Utbi, the Ghaznavid chronicler, in his Tarikh-i Yamini, records that many Afghans and Khiljis (possibly the modern Ghilji) living between Laghman and Peshawar enlisted in the army of Sabuktigin after Jayapala was defeated. Al-Utbi further states that Afghans and Ghiljis made up part of Mahmud Ghaznavi's army and were sent on his expedition to Tokharistan; on another occasion, Mahmud Ghaznavi attacked and punished a group of opposing Afghans, as also corroborated by Abulfazl Beyhaqi. It is recorded that Afghans were also enrolled in the Ghurid Kingdom (1148–1215). By the beginning of the Khilji dynasty in 1290, Afghans were well known in northern India.

Ibn Battuta, a famous Moroccan traveler, visiting Kabul following the era of the Khilji dynasty in 1333, wrote that the city had become occupied by Afghans, who "possess considerable strength" and were "mostly highwaymen".

A 16th-century Muslim historian, writing about the history of Muslim rule in the subcontinent, states:

"He [Khalid bin Abdullah son of Khalid bin Walid] retired ... and gave his daughter in marriage to one of the Afghan chiefs, who had become a proselyte to Mahomedism. From this marriage many children were born, among whom were two sons ... who each, subsequently, became head of the tribes which to this day bear their name. ... [W]hen the prophet Moses got the better of that infidel who was overwhelmed in the Red Sea, many of the Copts became converts to the Jewish faith; but others ... settled in the Sulimany mountains, where they bore the name of Afghans."

— Ferishta, 1560-1620

The term "Afghanistan" came into use in 1855 and was officially recognized by the British during the reign of Dost Mohammad Khan.

== Etymology ==
Some scholars suggest that the word "Afghan" is derived from the words awajan/apajan in Avestan and ava-Han/apa-Han in Sanskrit, which mean "killing, striking, throwing and resisting, or defending." Under the Sasanians, and possibly the Parthian Empire, the word was used to refer to men of a certain Persian sect. The word may also be an evolution of the name of the Aśvakan people, who lived in what is now modern-day Afghanistan.

19th- and 20th-century scholars have suggested that the name Afghan was derived from the word Aśvakan, meaning "horsemen" (from aśva or aspa, the Sanskrit and Avestan words for "horse"), or the Assakenoi of Arrian, the name used for ancient inhabitants of the Hindu Kush. However, more recent scholarship has noted linguistic inconsistencies that call the theory into question.

=== Afghanistan ===
The last part of the name -stān is a Persian suffix meaning "place of". The Pashto word stogna is found in several languages across Asia. The name Afghanistan is mentioned in writing by the 16th-century Mughal ruler Babur and his descendants, referring to the territory between Khorasan, Kabulistan, and the Indus River inhabited by tribes of Afghans.

"The road from Khorasān leads by way of Kandahār. It is a straight level road, and does not go through any hill-passes... In the country of Kābul there are many and various tribes. Its valleys and plains are inhabited by Tūrks, Aimāks, and Arabs. In the city and the greater part of the villages, the population consists of Tājiks*(Sarts). Many other of the villages and districts are occupied by Pashāis, Parāchis, Tājiks, Berekis, and Afghans... In the hill-country to the north-east lies Kaferistān, such as Kattor and Gebrek. To the south is Afghānistān."

— Babur, 1525

The name "Afghanistan" is also mentioned in the writings of the 16th-century historian Ferishta:

"The men of Kábul and Khilj also went home; and whenever they were questioned about the Musulmáns of the Kohistán (the mountains), and how matters stood there, they said, "Don't call it Kohistán, but Afghánistán; for there is nothing there but Afgháns and disturbances." Thus it is clear that for this reason the people of the country call their home in their own language Afghánistán, and themselves Afgháns. The people of India call them Patán; however the reason for this is not known. But it occurs to me, that when, under the rule of Muhammadan sovereigns, Musulmáns first came to the city of Patná, and dwelt there, the people of India (for that reason) called them Patáns—but God knows!"

— Ferishta, 1560-1620

Regarding the modern state of Afghanistan, the Encyclopædia of Islam explains:

"The country now known as Afghanistan has borne that name only since the middle of the 18th century, when the supremacy of the Afghan race became assured: previously various districts bore distinct apellations, however the country was not a definite political unit, and its component parts were not bound together by any identity of race or language. The earlier meaning of the word was simply "the land of the Afghans", a limited territory which did not include many parts of the present state but did comprise large districts now either independent or within the boundary of British India (Pakistan)."

== Historical and obsolete suggestions ==
There are a number of other hypotheses historically suggested for the name, all of them now considered obsolete.

- The Maḫzan-e Afġān by Nimat Allah al-Harawi, written in 1612 at the Mughal court, traces the name Afghan to an eponymous ancestor, Afghana, identified as a grandson of Saul. Afghana was supposedly a son of Irmia (Jeremia), who was in turn a son of Saul (Talut). Afghana was orphaned at a young age and brought up by David. When Solomon became king, Afghana was appointed commander-in-chief of the army. Neither Afghana nor Jeremia, son of Saul, appears in the Hebrew Bible. Some four centuries after Afghana, in the 6th century BCE, Bakhtunnasar (Nebuchadnezzar), the king of Babylon, attacked the Kingdom of Judah and exiled the descendants of Afghana, some of whom went to the mountains of Ghor in present-day Afghanistan and others to the vicinity of Mecca in Arabia. Until the time of Muhammad, the deported Children of Israel of the east continually increased in number in the countries around Ghor, which included Kabul, Kandahar, and Ghazni, and fought wars with surrounding groups. Khalid bin Walid is said to belong to the tribe of descendants of Afghana in the vicinity of Mecca, although he was actually from the tribe of Quraysh. After converting to Islam, Khalid invited his kinsmen, the Children of Israel of Ghor, to Islam. A deputation led by Qais proceeded to Medina to meet Muhammad and embraced Islam. Muhammad bestowed blessings on them and gave the name Abdur Rashid to Qais, who returned to Ghor to propagate Islam. Qais had three sons, Sarban, Bettan, and Ghourghusht, who are considered progenitors of various Pashtun tribes.
- Samuel G. Benjamin (1887) derived the name Afghan from a term for 'wailing', which the Persians are said to have used contemptuously for their plaintive eastern neighbors.
- H. W. Bellew, in his 1891 An Inquiry into the Ethnography of Afghanistan, believes that the name Afghan comes from Alban, which derives from the Latin term albus, meaning "white" or "mountain", as mountains are often white-capped with snow (cf. Alps); used by Armenians as Alvan or Alwan, which refers to mountaineers and, in the case of transliterated Armenian characters, would be pronounced Aghvan or Aghwan. To the Persians, this would further be altered to Aoghan, Avghan, and Afghan as a reference to the eastern highlanders or "mountaineers".
- Michanovsky suggests the name Afghan derives from Sanskrit Avagana, which in turn derives from the ancient Sumerian word for Badakhshan, Ab-bar-Gan, meaning "high country".
- Scholars such as Yu Gankovsky have attempted to link "Afghan" to an Uzbek word "Avagan", said to mean "original".

== See also ==
- List of country name etymologies
- Name of Afghanistan
- Pashtuns
