= Mehrinoz Abbosova =

Uzbek poet and stateswoman (born 1995)

- Mehrinoz Nosirjon qizi Abbosova
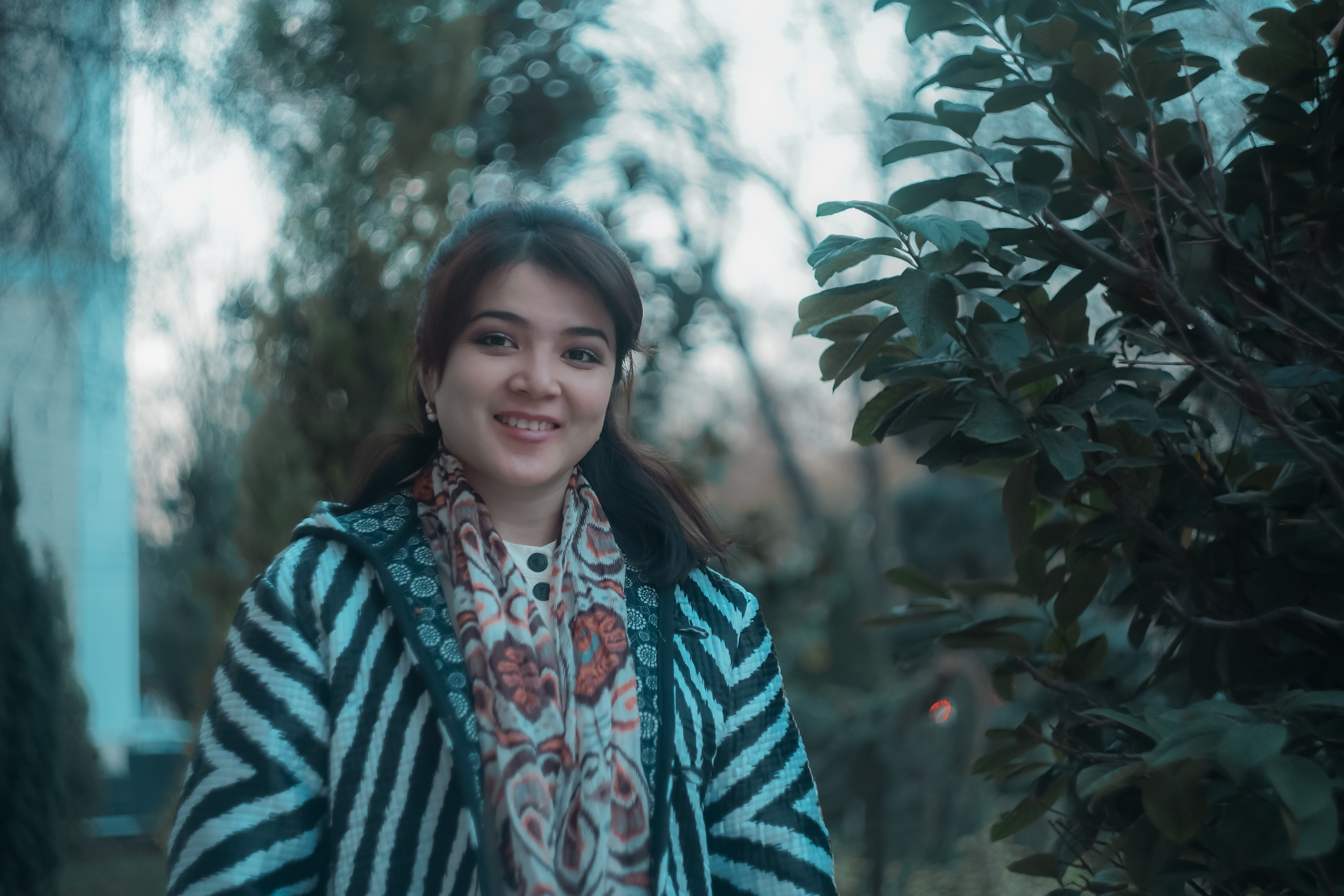
- Born: July 23, 1995 (age 30); Chortoq
- Citizenship: Uzbekistan
- Education: Bachelor Uzbekistan State World Languages University; Master's Tashkent State University of Uzbek Language and Literature named after Alisher Navoi
- Occupation: Advisor to the director of the Youth Affairs Agency of the Republic of Uzbekistan on issues of the State language
- Organization: Youth Affairs Agency of the Republic of Uzbekistan
- Predecessor: Qobuljon Ahmedov
- Spouse: Xushnud Xudoyberdiyev
- Children: Mustafo Gʻayratov
- Parents: Nosirjon Dehkanov (father); Muqaddasxon Dehkanova (mother)
- Awards: Zulfiya State Award, Shuhrat Medal
- Website: MehrNoz

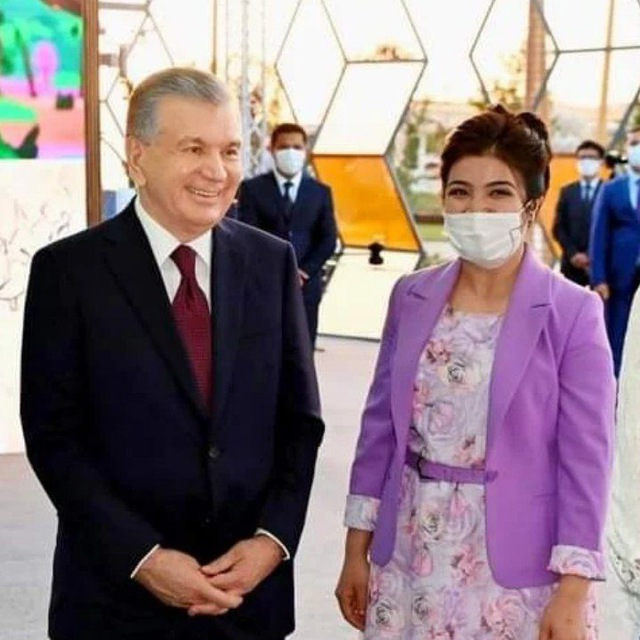
Shavkat Mirziyoyev and Mehrinoz Abbasova. A clip from the presentation of the WikiStipendiya project. June 30, 2022

Mehrinoz Abbosova (born July 23, 1995; Uzbekistan) is an Uzbek poet, journalist, and literary critic. In 2017, Abbosova was appointed by Uzbek President Shavkat Mirziyoyev as chair of the newly established Republican Council of Young Artists. In this role, she led numerous festivals and other projects to support young artists across Uzbekistan. Abbosova was also involved in projects aimed at creating quality digital content in Uzbek, including the WikiStipendiya edit-a-thon on Uzbek Wikipedia. Since 2022, Abbosova has served as an advisor to the director of the Youth Affairs Agency of the Republic of Uzbekistan.

She has been a member of the Uzbekistan Writers Association since 2018. She was awarded the state Zulfiya Award in 2012 and Shuhrat Medal in 2017. She has published two poetry collections "Men yoshlikman" (2011) and "Yulduzrang qoʻshiqlar" (2014).

== Biography ==
Mehrinoz Abbasova was born on July 23, 1995, in Chortoq District in the Namangan Region of Uzbekistan. She was the youngest of 3 children. She credits her father Nosirjon Dehqonov as her first teacher:

... Now that I understand, my father counted on my thoughts, dreams, and goals since I was a child. Those who instilled strong confidence in me. I am always proud to be the daughter of the best dad in the world, a humble and honest man.

Abbosova spent her childhood in the cities of Chortoq and Namangan. In 2002, she began studying at secondary school No. 45. After her family moved to Namangan in 2004, she studied at secondary school No. 57 from 2004 to 2007, and at specialized school No. 57 from 2007 to 2011. She later studied at lyceum No. 2 under Namangan State University. She began studying English in 4th grade. At school, Abbosova participated in artistic gymnastics and dance clubs, and learned to play piano. She tutored at a music school. She originally wished to study at the Tashkent Medical Institute to become a doctor.

Through her interest in poetry as a child she met writers from Namangan, including Ziyaviddin Mansur and Gulomjon Akbarov. In 2012, she won the Zulfiya State Prize in the field of literature. Her books Men yoshlikman (2011) andYulduzrang qoʻshiqlar (2014) were published with the recommendation of the Uzbekistan Writers Association.

In 2014, Abbosova entered the Faculty of International Journalism of the Uzbekistan State University of World Languages. In 2017, she gave a speech at the 4th congress of the Kamalot Youth Social Movement. This caught the attention of President Mirziyoyev, who appointed Abbasova to chair the newly established Republican Council of Young Artists while she was still a student. In 2017, she was awarded the Medal of Fame.

From 2018 to 2020, she completed a master's degree on the Higher Literature Course of Alisher Navoi Tashkent State University of Uzbek Language and Literature. In 2018, she joined the Writers' Association of Uzbekistan. Since February 11, 2022, she has worked as an adviser to the director of the Youth Affairs Agency of the Republic of Uzbekistan on issues of the State language.

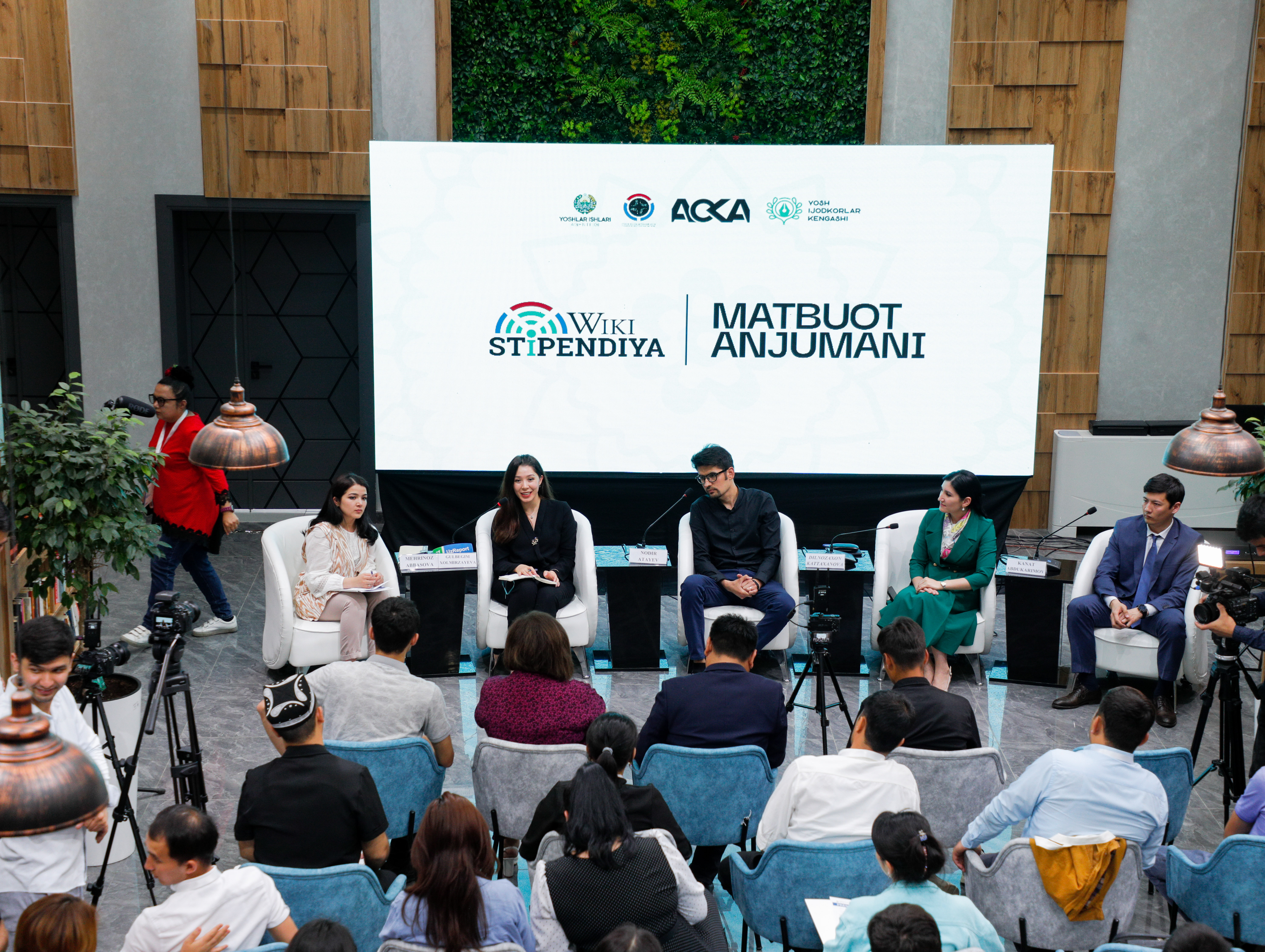
Press conference for WikiStipendiya

Abbasova has contributed to the organization and implementation of several large projects in the Youth Affairs Agency of the Republic of Uzbekistan, in particular, the WikiStipendiya marathon. In June 2022, President Mirziyoyev spoke at an event dedicated to Youth Day and said:

… I was happy to hear that more than 10,000 articles in the Uzbek language have been posted on Wikipedia, the world's most popular electronic encyclopedia by the initiative of Mehrinoz Abbosova.

Mehrinoz Abbasova's poems were translated into Turkish and published in Gerçek Fethiye Newspaper.

== Family ==
Abbosova is married to Xushnud Xudoyberdiyev, an Uzbek blogger and lawyer. They have one son, Mustafo.
