= Tim Abdullah Khan =

- Abdullaxon timi
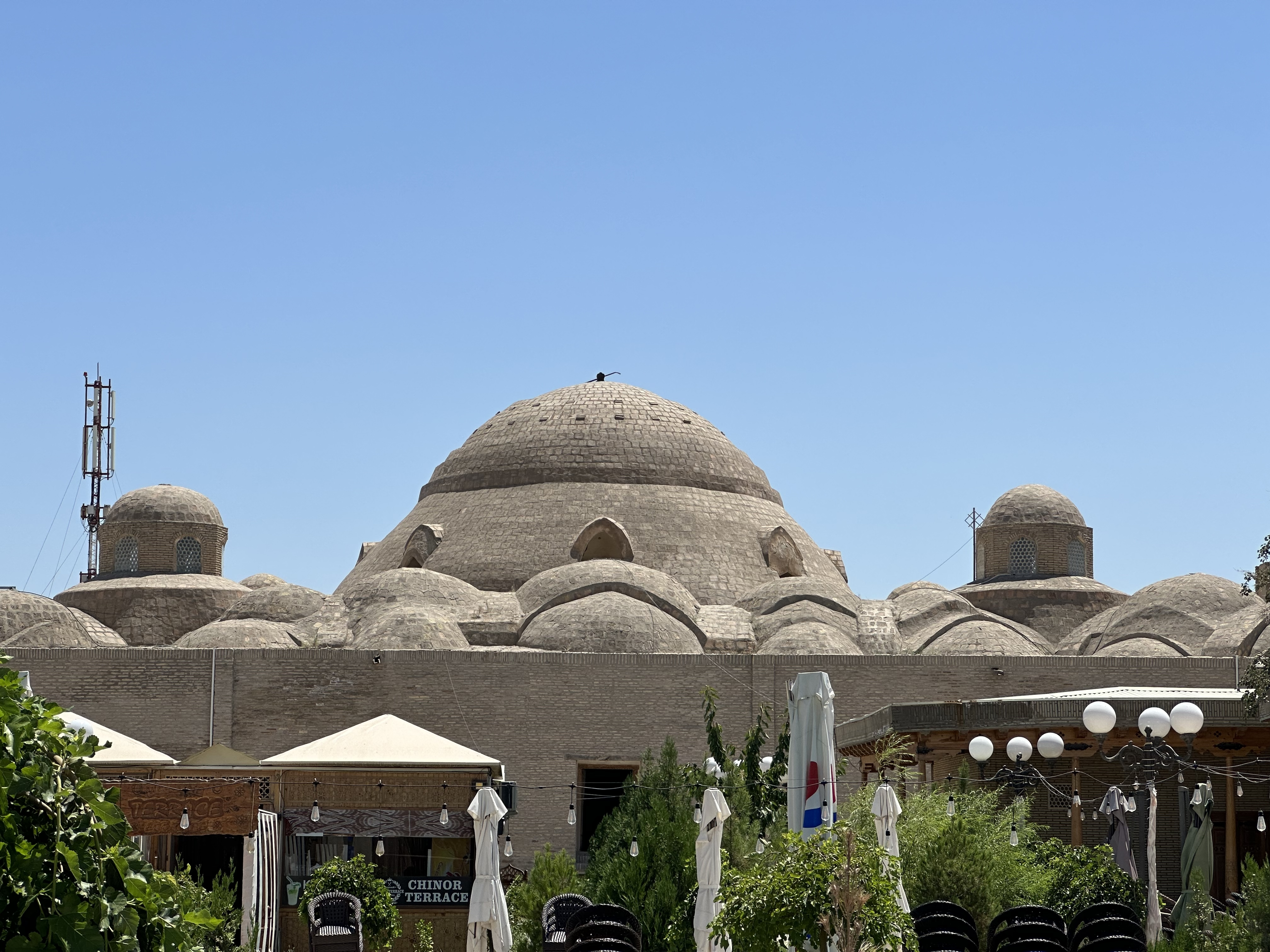
- Tim Abdullah Khan in Bukhara
- Interactive map of the Tim Abdullah Khan area
- Former names: Tim-i Kalyan, Tim-i Kalon
- Etymology: Named after Abdullah Khan II, the ruler of Bukhara Khanate

General information
- Status: Active
- Type: Covered marketplace
- Architectural style: Persian
- Location: Bukhara, Bukhara, Uzbekistan
- Coordinates: 39.774°N 64.413°E
- Current tenants: Carpet shops and trade stalls
- Year built: 1577

Technical details
- Material: Baked bricks
- Size: 39 x 42 meters

The Tim Abdullah Khan (Abdullaxon timi) is one of the domed bazaars in the Bukhara Khanate. It was built by the Bukhara Khan Shaybanid Abdullah Khan II in 1577. It is currently included in the UNESCO World Heritage List.

The tim is located in the southwest of the ensemble Abdulaziz Khan and Ulugbek madrasas. It was a center of Central Asia’s famed silk trade through the centuries, and is the sole survivor of erstwhile Bukhara's six covered markets. The tim is built in the Persian style, resembling the traditional market of ancient Iranian cities.

== History ==
Tim Abdullah Khan was one of the largest closed trade centers. Tim Abdullah Khan was also known as Timi Kalon or Great Tim. This tim was built in 1577 by the Shaybanid ruler of the Bukhara Khanate, Abdullah Khan II, for the purpose of selling fabrics. The tim was located on the main trade street and consisted of six arched gates. It was a building with eight domed rooms, where trade shops were located. Fabrics were sold at Tim Abdullah Khan for centuries. In the early 20th century, silk and other types of fabrics were sold at the tim. The fabrics were stored in special chests. In front of the tim, there was a Choxarsoyi Darun or Inner shop, which was built in the late 16th century and had about 30 shops for selling various goods. There were also four carpet and four cloth shops. Foreign merchants also traded at this closed bazaar. According to Galina Pugachenkova, the arched niches of the tim formed 56 shops. The light came from the windows above the dome. The central hall of Tim Abdullah Khan was surrounded by small domes. There was a Silk market at this tim. Tim Abdullah Khan is considered one of the architectural objects with many domes and arches. Currently, Tim Abdullah Khan has carpet shops and trade stalls.

== Architecture ==
The largest closed trade center in Bukhara. Built during the reign of Abdullah Khan (1577). Tim Abdullah Khan has a square plan (39 x 42 meters), 3 sides are closed, and the entrance is through a large arched portal. There are arched niches on both sides of the walls. A high-domed octagonal tim stands in the center. The central pavilion (diameter - 10 meters) is covered with a high dome. The light comes from the arched openings under the dome. The pavilion is surrounded by a gallery. There are domed shops in the small arches of the gallery. The building is made of baked bricks (22 x 27 x 3.5 centimeters), the walls are plastered, the patterns and ornaments are almost lost. In the past, silk, woolen fabrics were traded here. Tim Abdullah Khan is the largest and most complex in shape and composition of the trade centers, "chor-su-tok" buildings in Bukhara. It has been repaired several times, and trade shops are located there.

== See also ==
- Toqi Sarrofon

== Bibliography ==
- Rajabov, Q.; Inoyatov, S. (2016). Buxoro tarixi (in Uzbek). Tashkent: Tafakkur nashriyoti. ISBN 978-9943-24-119-0.
- Pugachenkova, G. (1979). Tim va toqlar. (ingliz, rus va o'zbek tillarida) (in Uzbek). Tashkent: O'zbekiston nashriyoti. p. 14.
- Azizxo'jayev, A. (1997). Buxoro sharq durdonasi (in Uzbek). Tashkent: Sharq nashriyoti. p. 232.
- OʻzME. Volume 1. Tashkent, 2000.
