= Alisher Saʼdullayev =

Uzbek politician

- Алишер Саъдуллаев
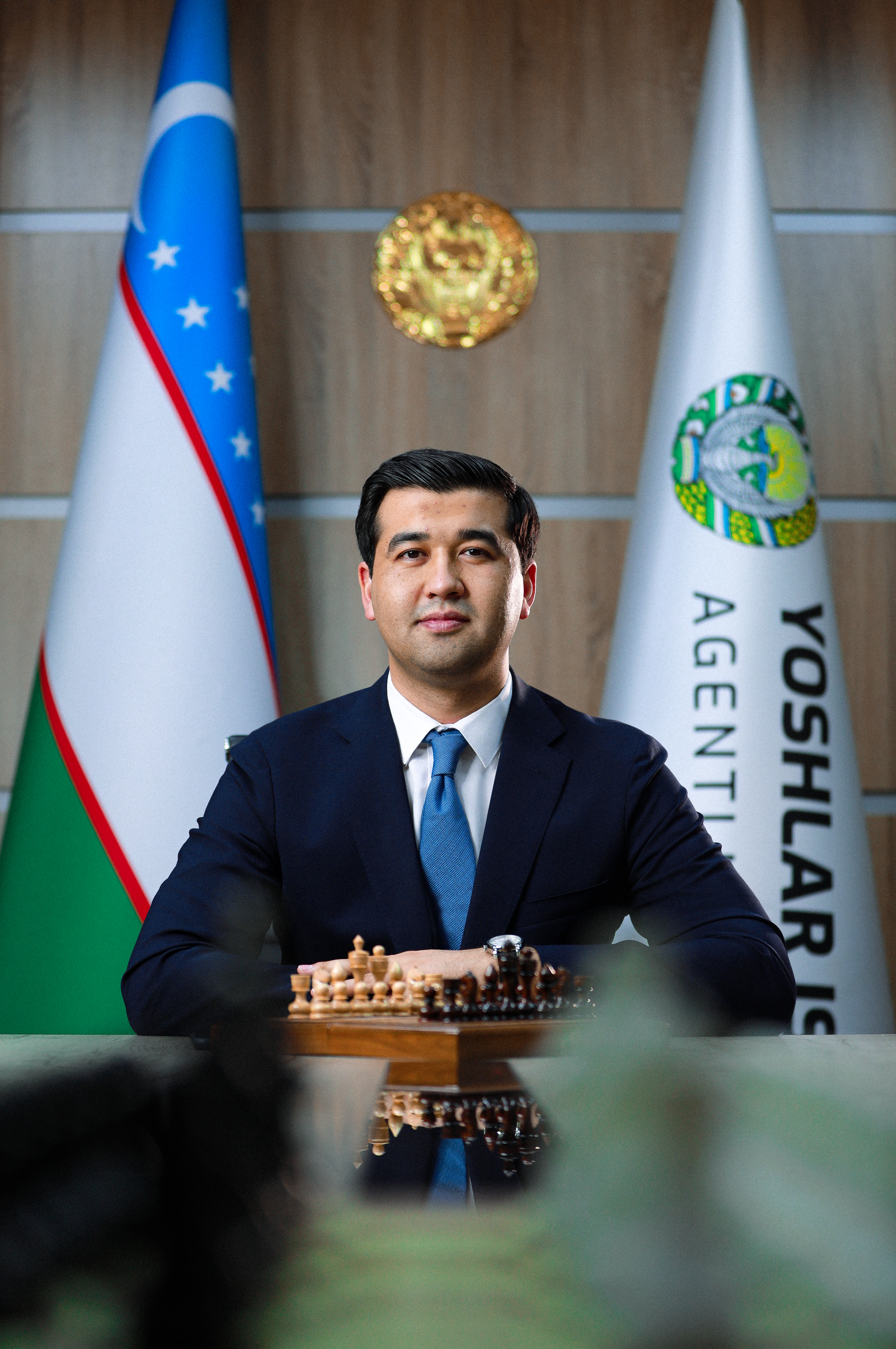

First Deputy to the Minister of Youth Policy and Sports of the Republic of Uzbekistan
- President: Shavkat Mirziyoyev
- Prime Minister: Abdulla Aripov
- Preceded by: Position established

Chairperson of the Uzbekistan Chess Federation
- In office 24 May 2022 – 4 October 2024
- President: Shavkat Mirziyoyev
- Prime Minister: Abdulla Aripov
- Preceded by: Aziz Abduhakimov

Director of the Youth Affairs Agency of Uzbekistan
- Incumbent
- Assumed office 30 June 2020
- President: Shavkat Mirziyoyev
- Prime Minister: Abdulla Aripov
- Preceded by: Position established

Member of the Senate of Uzbekistan
- Incumbent
- Assumed office January 2020
- President: Shavkat Mirziyoyev
- Prime Minister: Abdulla Aripov

Personal details
- Born: Saʼdullayev Alisher Zafarovich; 11 July 1994 (age 32) Jizzakh District, Jizzakh Region, Uzbekistan
- Education: Management Development Institute of Singapore in Tashkent
- Awards: Order "Mehnat Shuhrati"
- Website: Official Telegram channel

Alisher Zafarovich Saʼdullayev (Uzbek Latin: Alisher Zafarovich (Zafar o‘g‘li) Saʼdullayev, Uzbek Cyrillic: Алишер Зафарович (Зафар ўғли) Саъдуллев; born 11 July 1994) is an Uzbek politician who has served as Director of the Youth Affairs Agency of Uzbekistan since 2020. He is also First deputy chairperson of the Uzbek Chess Federation and has been a member of the Senate of Uzbekistan since 2020, when, at age 25, he became the youngest member of the Senate in the country's 29-year history by presidential decree.

Previously, Saʼdullayev worked as Chairperson of the Youth Union of Uzbekistan (2019-2020), First Deputy Advisor to the President of Uzbekistan on Youth, Science, Education, Health, Culture and Sports Affairs (2019-2020), and Deputy Minister of Public Education for Youth Affairs (2017-2018). In June 2021, Saʼdullayev was awarded the Mehnat Shuhrati state prize. He is married and has two daughters.

== Career ==
After being appointed Chairperson of the Youth Union of Uzbekistan, Saʼdullayev overhauled the union and introduced several major changes. He canceled membership in the agency and launched a scholarship program for outstanding students and promoted a culture of volunteerism among young people, particularly during the COVID-19 pandemic and in the wake of the Sardoba dam failure. Saʼdullayev has also been taking measures to promote a reading culture among young people throughout his career: during his tenure as the Chairperson of the Youth Union of Uzbekistan, he established the Young Readers book reading competition. Since being appointed Director of the Youth Affairs Agency, the union's successor, he has been supporting the translation of foreign-language books into Uzbek and the publication of new volumes. In 2022, a six-volume pocketbook on Uzbek Jadids entitled "Jadidlar" was published under his guidance and distributed free of charge.

In 2017, President Mirziyoyev established a Youth Day to be celebrated annually across Uzbekistan on June 30 at Saʼdullayev's initiative. Saʼdullayev has also led efforts to compensate students who perform well on standardized tests such the IELTS. Under his guidance, the Youth Affairs Agency has launched several diversity and inclusion initiatives, including a scholarship program for people with disabilities. Saʼdullayev is one of the initiators of the WikiStipendiya, a large-scale WikiProject that is aimed at increasing article coverage on the Uzbek Wikipedia. He has a large social media following: his Telegram channel has over 275,000 subscribers.

Saʼdullayev was appointed Chairperson of the Uzbek Chess Federation in May 2022. In August 2022, Uzbekistan won the 44th Chess Olympiad, with the five-man Uzbek team winning the gold medal in the open event with a total of 19 match points. Their eight wins and three draws made them the only undefeated team in the tournament. Shortly after the tournament Saʼdullayev announced that Uzbekistan would host the 46th Chess Olympiad in 2026.

On December 20, 2022, President Shavkat Mirziyoyev announced that the number of ministries and agencies in the country would be reduced from 61 to 28. The Youth Affairs Agency was added to the newly established Ministry of Youth Policy and Sports. 54-year-old Adham Ikramov was appointed to the post of Minister. Saʼdullayev was appointed First Deputy Minister while retaining his previous positions.

In January 2024, the Ministry of Youth Policy and Sports of the Republic of Uzbekistan was reorganized into the Ministry of Sports. The Youth Affairs Agency was transferred to the Cabinet of Ministers of the Republic of Uzbekistan. Saʼdullayev remained as the director of the agency.

On 4 October 2024, an extraordinary meeting of the Chess Federation of Uzbekistan was held, and Prime Minister of Uzbekistan Abdulla Aripov was elected chairman of the country's Chess Federation. Alisher Saʼdullayev, who has been working in this position since May 2022, was appointed to the position of first deputy chairman of the federation.

== Personal life ==
Born and raised in Jizzakh District of Uzbekistan, Saʼdullayev has a degree in marketing and business management from the Management Development Institute of Singapore in Tashkent. He is married and has two daughters.

== See also ==
- Dilnozaxon Kattaxonova
- Mehrinoz Abbosova
