= WikiStipendiya =

WikiProject on the Uzbek Wikipedia

- WikiStipendiya marafoni
- Official logo
- Formation: May 20, 2022
- Founder: Youth Affairs Agency of the Republic of Uzbekistan; Agency of Information and Mass Communications; Council of Young Artists; Wikimedians of the Uzbek Language User Group
- Founded at: Tashkent, Uzbekistan
- Dissolved: July 8, 2025; 15 months ago
- Legal status: Defunct
- Headquarters: Tashkent, Uzbekistan
- Methods: Edit-a-thon
- Official language: Uzbek
- Key people: Alisher Saʼdullayev, Director of the Youth Affairs Agency; Mehrinoz Abbosova, Adviser of the Director of Youth Affairs Agency on the State Language; Muhammadxon Yusupov, Chairman of the State Young Artists Council
- Website: Official Telegram channel

WikiStipendiya (Uzbek for WikiScholarship) was a WikiProject aimed at improving content on the Uzbek Wikipedia. The project was organized by the Youth Affairs Agency of Uzbekistan, the Council of Young Artists, and the Wikimedians of the Uzbek Language User Group. The name of the project is a portmanteau of the words "wiki" and "stipendiya" (scholarship). It focused on encouraging content creation on the Uzbek Wikipedia, particularly by students, but was not limited to any group. Another goal was to increase the number of editors on Uzbek-language wikis.

The first phase of the project, which ran from May to December 2022, was focused on encouraging individual participants to create quality content on projects of the Wikimedia Foundation, primarily Uzbek Wikipedia. The second phase, which ran from June to December 2023, was organized as series of shorter-term thematic edit-a-thons, with each month dedicated to a specific region of Uzbekistan. The second season also encouraged users to upload photographs of settlements and cultural heritage monuments in Uzbekistan to Wikimedia Commons. The third season, which lasted from May to December 2024, was organized as a seven month edit-a-thon among groups of at least five members.

The edit-a-thon generated significant interest in Uzbekistan, with major publications running stories about the project throughout its duration. In 2023, WikiStipendiya won Best Project of the Year Award of the independent Rost24 news agency. However, the project also led to the creation of a large number of poor-quality, machine-translated articles, as the organizers prioritized rapid article growth.

== History ==
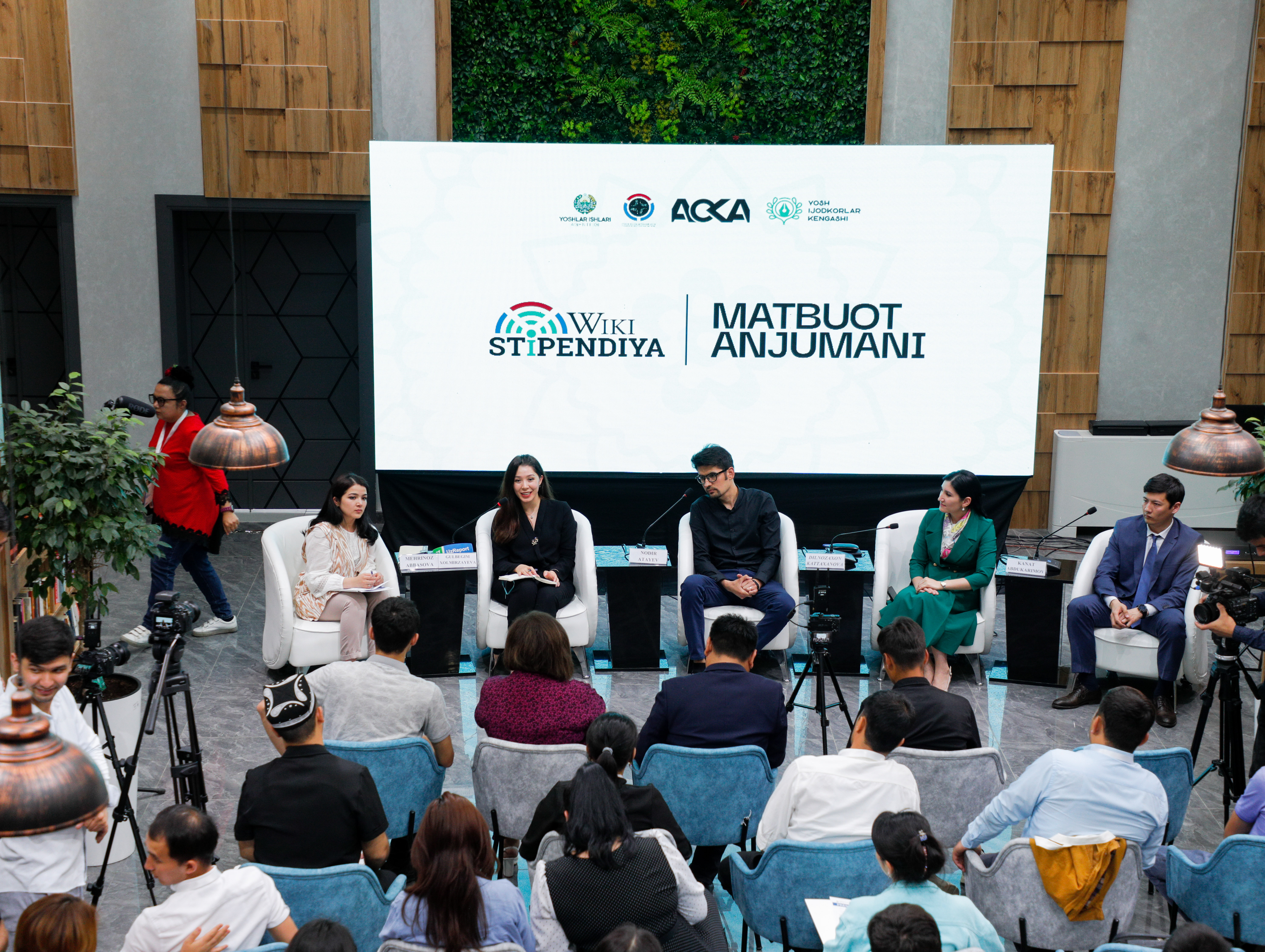
WikiStipendiya press conference in Tashkent

WikiStipendiya was inspired by a 2019 decree of President Shavkat Mirziyoyev on encouraging the creation of quality digital content in Uzbek. The Youth Affairs Agency decided to launch an edit-a-thon with a large prize fund and secured the cooperation of the Agency of Information and Mass Communications and the Council of Young Artists. Soon thereafter the Wikimedians of the Uzbek Language User Group committed to fully support the initiative.

On 13 May 2022, a press conference was organized in Tashkent to spread the word about the edit-a-thon. WikiStipendiya generated significant interest among students and media in Uzbekistan, with several publications running stories about it. By the time the edit-a-thon officially started on May 20, close to 15,000 people had subscribed to the official Telegram channel of the edit-a-thon. With the support of the Youth Affairs Agency, a series of 12 video lessons were recorded and uploaded to Uzbek Wikipedia's YouTube channel prior to the official launch of the edit-a-thon.

On 30 June 2022, three active contributors of the Uzbek Wikipedia met with President Mirziyoyev during Youth Day celebrations in Tashkent and discussed the WikiStipendiya edit-a-thon in particular and the state of wiki projects in Uzbek in general.

On 30 May 2023, the second phase of the project was launched. The second phase of the project in 2023 also encouraged the creation of articles about Uzbekistan in foreign languages, and introduced new subprojects such as WikiTour and WikiQuiz. The initiative was launched on 1 June 2023 at Namangan State University with an event featuring representative of the Youth Affairs Agency and active Wikimedians. Several month-long edit-a-thons were organized throughout the second season of WikiStipendiya II. The third and final phase lasted from May to December 2024.

== Methods ==
=== First phase ===
Maryana Iskander and Jimmy Wales's video address screened at the WikiStipendiya Awards Ceremony

The first phase of WikiStipendiya was organized as an edit-a-thon running from 20 May 2022 to 20 December 2022. Participants had to be at least 15 years old and were encouraged to create content on any subject they found interesting. Still, six broad topics were proposed (natural sciences, history, art and culture, philosophy, technology, humanity, sports and games, and geography) and a work list of red linked articles was created to make it easier to find and create the missing articles.

The most active participants of the first phase were awarded one-off scholarships totaling US$30,000. Active members of the Wikimedians of the Uzbek Language User Group took on responsibility for evaluating the participants' contributions. Additionally, several rounds of interim contests were organized to attract new editors. Winners of interims contests were awarded laptops. A total of four weeklong wikicamps were organized in August and November 2022 and February and April 2023, with each attended by nearly 150 participants.

=== Second phase ===
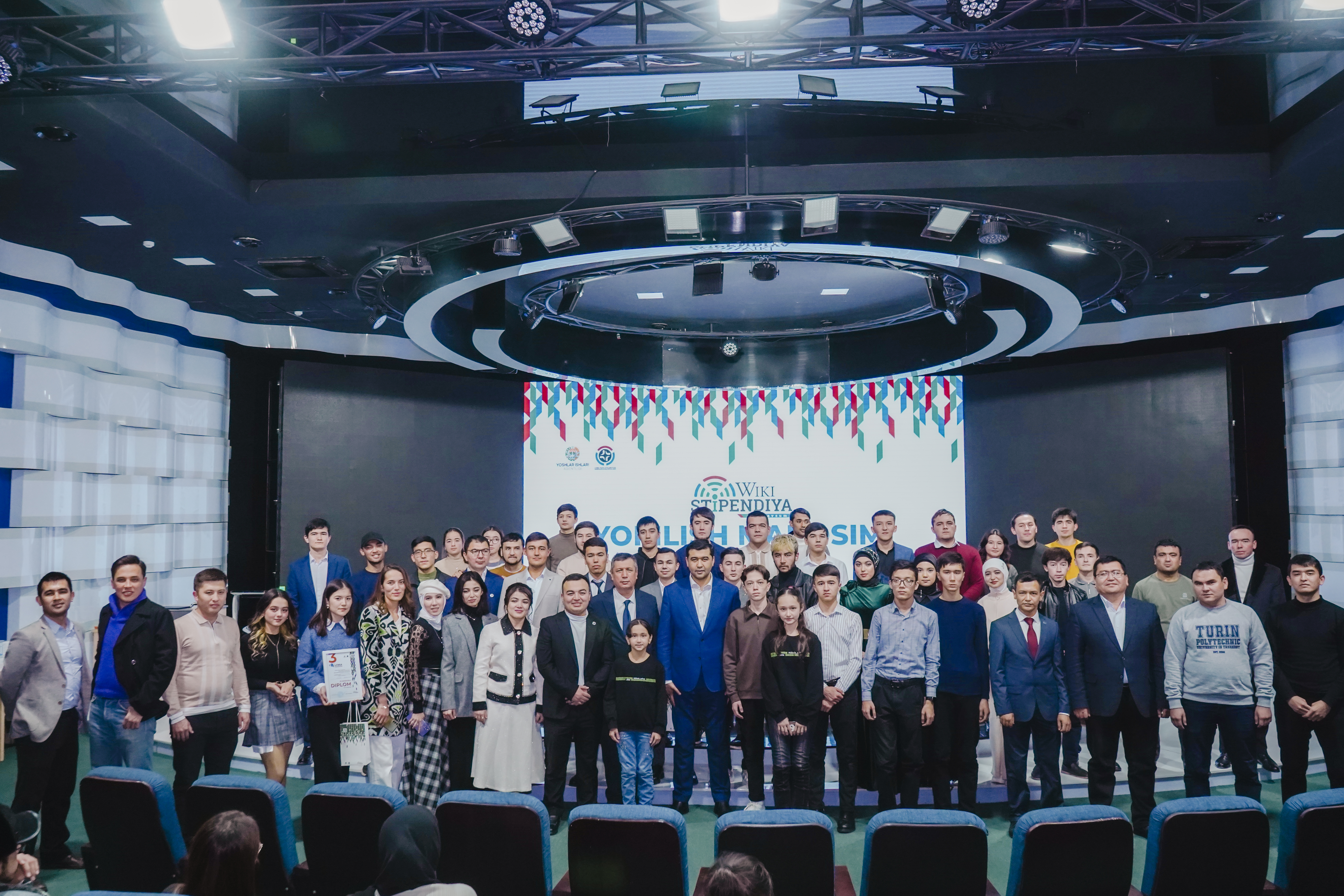
WikiStipendiya II Awards Ceremony held in Tashkent on December 16, 2023

The second phase of WikiStipendiya was organized as a series of edit-a-thons running from 1 June 2023 to 30 November 2023. The edit-a-thons were thematic, with each month dedicated to a specific region of Uzbekistan. Participants who created quality content received individual prizes. In September 2023, a weeklong wikicamp was organized for close to 150 participants.

Several new sub-projects were introduced during the second phase. WikiTours involved traveling to 12 out of the 14 administrative divisions of Uzbekistan to spread the word about the project and the Wikimedia Movement as well as photographing settlements and cultural heritage monuments and uploading them to Wikimedia Commons. Another side project launched during the second phase was WikiQuiz, a series of group quiz games with trivia questions taken from Wikipedia articles. On 16 December 2023, an awards ceremony was held in Tashkent, during which it was announced that WikiStipendiya would continue in 2024.

=== Third phase ===
The third season, which lasted from May to December 2024, was organized as a seven month edit-a-thon among groups of at least five members. The awards ceremony for the last season was held on December 20, 2024.

== Sub-projects ==
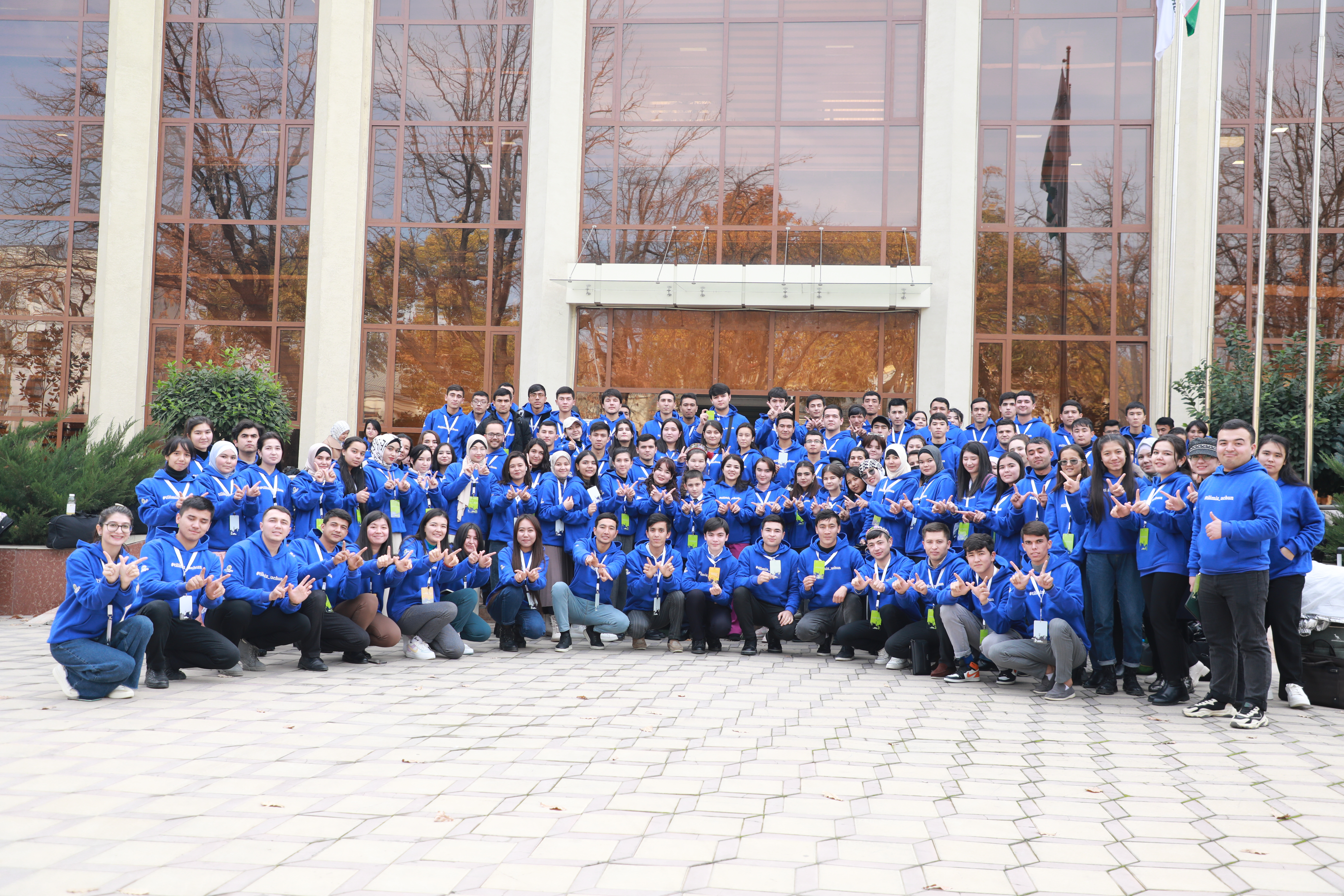
Participants of the weeklong WikiOromgoh-2 camp

Several other sub-projects were organized within the marathon, including:

- ErkinLitsenziyalar: promotion of open content licenses
- WikiAudio: creating audio articles in Uzbek
- WikiAyollar: closing the gender gap on the Uzbek Wikipedia by creating content on women
- WikiOromgoh: seven weeklong camps for over 1,000 participants
- WikiSport: improving sport-related content on the Uzbek Wikipedia
- WikiTaʼlim: introducing Wiki Education to Uzbekistan

A total of seven weeklong camps were organized over the course of the project. Two of the camps were thematically modeled around Hogwarts, the fictional boarding school of magic for students in J. K. Rowling's Harry Potter series.

Logo	Camp	Dates	Number of Participants
	WikiOromgoh	August 1–7, 2022	~150
	WikiOromgoh II	November 23–30, 2022	~150
	WikiOromgoh III	April 14–20, 2023	~150
	WeekieHogwarts	September 25 – October 1, 2023	~200
Logo of the WikiOromgoh camp	WikiOromgoh IV	March 4–9, 2024	~200
	WeekieHogwarts II	June 24–30, 2024	~150
	WikiOromgoh V	September 2–7, 2024	~140

== Results ==
By the completion of the first phase of WikiStipendiya on 20 December 2022, the number of articles on the Uzbek Wikipedia had surpassed 216,000. In total, nearly 77,000 articles were created during the period from May to December 2022. WikiStipendiya also resulted in significant growth of active users on the Uzbek Wikipedia. As of January 2023, a majority of new users that began to contribute during the contest remained active.

During the second phase of the project, which ran from 1 June 2023 to 30 November 2023, around 8,000 new articles were created, with the total number of articles exceeding 247,000 by the end of November 2023. In addition, a large number of files were uploaded to Wikimedia Commons, particularly photographs of settlements and heritage sites taken during WikiTours to 12 out of the 14 administrative divisions of Uzbekistan. The second phase also involved a translation edit-a-thon to encourage the creation of content related to Uzbekistan in other Wikipedias as well as a quality-content edit-a-thon to promote the creation of good and featured articles on the Uzbek Wikipedia.

WikiStipendiya also contributed to a revival of the Wikipedia in the Karakalpak language, which is spoken mostly in Karakalpakstan in western Uzbekistan. The Karakalpak Wikipedia had remained largely inactive before 2022.

However, the project also resulted in a large number of poor-quality, machine-translated articles, as the organizers prioritized rapid article growth. According to long-term contributors, this harmed the project's reputation as a trustworthy source.
