= Uzbek Soviet Encyclopedia =

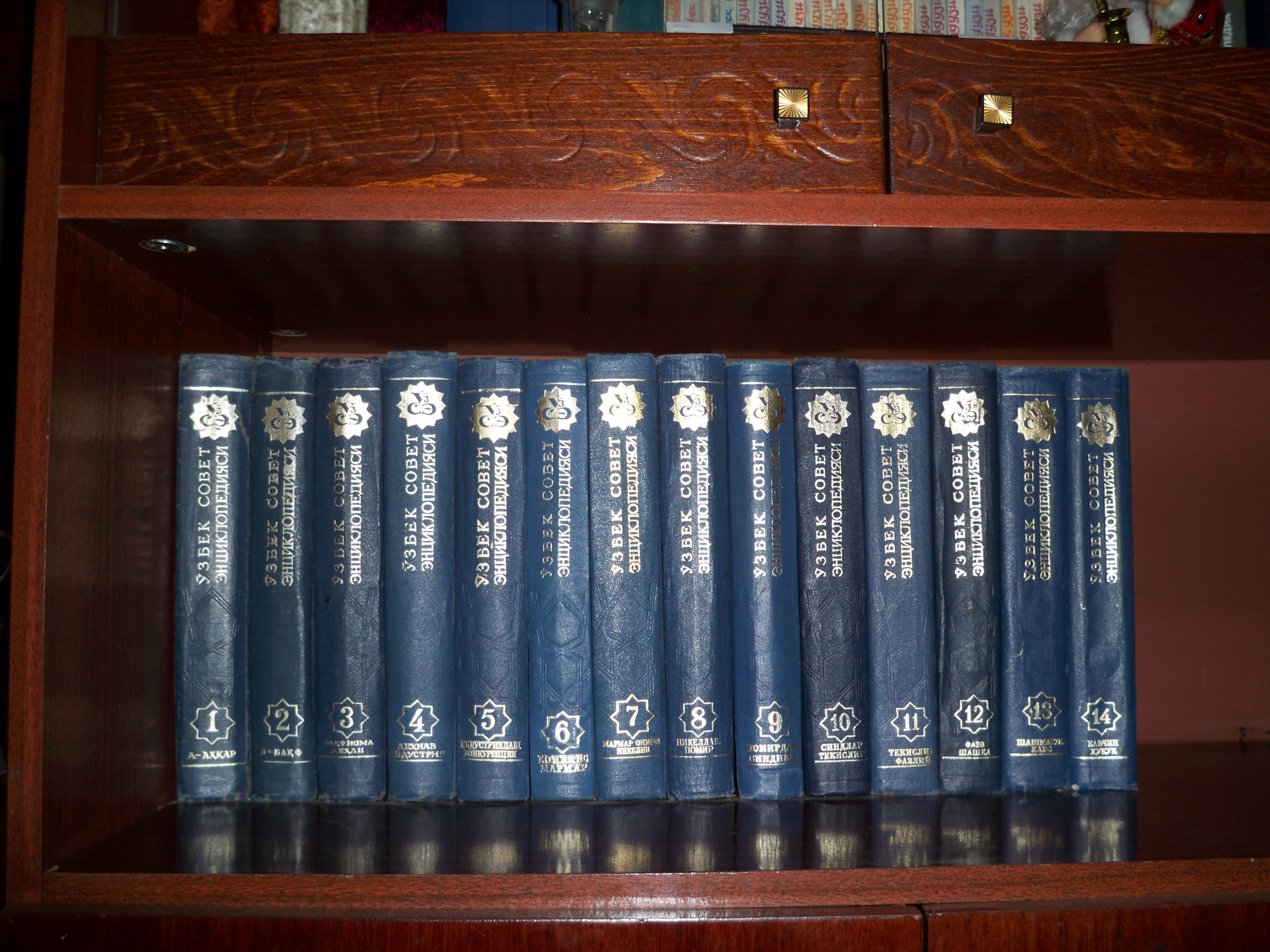
- Language: Uzbek
- Subject: General
- Genre: Reference encyclopaedia
- Publisher: Uzbek Soviet Encyclopedia Publishing House
- Publication date: 1971–1980
- Publication place: Uzbek SSR, USSR
- Media type: 14 volumes (hardbound)

The Uzbek Soviet Encyclopedia (Uzbek: Oʻzbek sovet ensikopediyasi, OʻzSE in Latin script, Ўзбек совет энциклопедияси, ЎзСЭ in Cyrillic script; Russian: Узбекская советская энциклопедия, УзСЭ) is the largest and most comprehensive encyclopedia in the Uzbek language, comprising 14 volumes. It is the first general-knowledge encyclopedia in Uzbek.

The Uzbek Soviet Encyclopedia was printed in the Cyrillic script. Although the encyclopedia contained some articles translated from the Russian-language Great Soviet Encyclopedia, its coverage of topics skewed towards Uzbek interests.

== History ==
The Uzbek Soviet Encyclopedia was published in Tashkent from 1971 to 1980 by the Uzbek Soviet Encyclopedia Publishing House. Doctor Ibrohim Moʻminov, a member of the Academy of Sciences of Uzbekistan, was the chief editor of volumes one through nine. Komiljon Zufarov was the chief editor of volumes ten through fourteen. The Uzbek Soviet Encyclopedia was not available in Russian.

== Content ==
The Uzbek Soviet Encyclopedia is a comprehensive source of knowledge in social and economic studies and in the applied sciences. A major value of the encyclopedia is its comprehensive information about the USSR in general and the Uzbek SSR in particular. Every aspect of life in Soviet Uzbekistan is systematically presented, including history, economy, science, art, and culture. There are comprehensive biographies of prominent Uzbek cultural and scientific figures who are not as well known outside of Uzbekistan.

The Uzbek Soviet Encyclopedia contains extensive writings on Sufism, and generally positive coverage of Uzbek Sufi philosophers such as Khoja Akhmet Yassawi. The encyclopedia criticizes anti-Soviet writers such as Abdulrauf Fitrat and Choʻlpon as bourgeois nationalists, but these figures were rehabilitated during glasnost.

== See also ==
- Great Soviet Encyclopedia
- National Encyclopedia of Uzbekistan
