= Ibragim Muminov =

Uzbek philosopher (1908–1974)

Ibragim Muminov (Russified form Ibraghim Muminov) (Uzbek: Ibrohim Moʻminov, November 7, 1908, Tezguzar, Bukharan Emirate – July 22, 1974, Tashkent) was an Uzbek intellectual and scholar. Founder of the philosophical school in Uzbekistan.

== Early life ==
Muminov initially studied at maktab – a Muslim school, and after 1920, opportunities for studying at the Soviet school appeared. In 1922–1927 he studied at the Institute of Education in Bukhara, since 1925 he was a teacher at the school.

Muminov in the late 1920s continued his studies in the capital of Uzbekistan – Samarkand, where he graduated from the socio-economic faculty of the Uzbek Pedagogical Academy with a degree in history, philosophy in 1931.

== Academic career ==
Muminov was an active participant in the creation of the Samarkand State University. In 1933, a joint literary faculty was appointed dean. From 1933 to 1935 he was dean of the history department of SamGU. Until 1941, he headed the department of philosophy. In 1937, the NKVD, on a false denunciation, arrested his brother Arabboy Muminov. The brother was sentenced to ten years in the Stalinist camps. A few years later, his brother's wife also died. In this difficult situation, Muminov took care of the children of his older brother.

Muminov participated in the organization of the Academy of Sciences of the Uzbek SSR and in the same 1943 was elected its corresponding member.

In 1950 he defended his doctoral dissertation at the Institute of Philosophy of the USSR Academy of Sciences. He was advised by such major scholars as: Sadriddin Ayni, as well as E.E. Bertels (1890–1957), a well-known orientalist, corresponding member of the USSR Academy of Sciences of the USSR.

From 1944 to 1955 he was the head of the Department of Philosophy at Samarkand State University.

He was the director of the Institute of History and Archeology of the Academy of Sciences of the Uzbek SSR (1955–1956). At his initiative, new departments were created at the Institute of History of the Academy of Sciences of the Uzbek SSR: "History of the Great Patriotic War", "History of Irrigation", and "Historiography".

In 1956 he was elected an academician of the Academy of Sciences of the Uzbek SSR, and from that year to 1974 he served as vice-president of the Academy of Sciences of the Uzbek SSR.

Muminov was the organizer and first director of the Institute of Philosophy and Law of the Academy of Sciences of the Uzbek SSR (1958–1959).

Muminov wrote more than 200 publications on various issues of philosophy and history. He was a deputy of the Supreme Council of the Uzbek SSR (4 convocations).

Muminov from 1966 to 1974 was chairman of the standing commission on foreign affairs of the Supreme Council of the Uzbek SSR.

Muminov was among the main organizers of the first All-Union Conference of Orientalists in Tashkent, which was held in July 1957. Orientalists from all over the Soviet Union, as well as China, Czechoslovakia, Mongolia, Vietnam, Romania took part in it.

In 1960, Muminov led the Uzbek delegation at the XXV International Congress of Orientalists in Moscow.

Muminov in the conditions of liberalization of the post-Stalin era tried to organizationally implement the unrealized plans of his teachers: V. Vyatkin, P. Saliev, M. Saidzhanov to study the history of Samarkand.

On the initiative of I. Muminov in 1964, it was decided to create a museum in Samarkand for his teacher S. Aini. In 1967, the museum was inaugurated.

In the 1960s, I. Muminov, with the support of Sh. Rashidov, developed the idea of a broad study of the history of higher education - the system of madrassas in Samarkand. It was planned to restore the education system at Mirzo Ulugbek Madrasah and celebrate the 550th anniversary of the madrasah in 1970, but the initiative came up against opposition from reactionaries both in Uzbekistan and abroad. Only after Uzbekistan gained independence in 2000, academician B. Valikhodjaev tried to revive this idea in a different format.

Muminov was the initiator and organizer of the conference in 1970 dedicated to the 2500th anniversary of Samarkand. By this date, the Institute of Archeology of the Academy of Sciences of the Republic of Uzbekistan was formed and transferred from Tashkent to Samarkand. In connection with the festivities of the 2500th anniversary of Samarkand, the Museum of the History of the Foundation of Samarkand was opened, and for the first time in the history of the Uzbek SSR, a monument to Mirzo Ulugbek was erected. A monument was also erected to the classics of oriental poetry A. Jami and A. Navoi. Under the editorship of Muminov, a two-volume history of Samarkand was prepared and published from ancient times until 1969.

The main focus of Muminov’s scholarly work was the study of the philosophical heritage of the peoples of Central Asia. He analyzed the ideas of the Enlightenment-era thinkers of the 19th and early 20th centuries, including Ahmad Donish, Furkat, Zavki, Muqimi, Hamza, Aini, and other prominent educators, writers, and poets.

== Editorial career ==
Muminov was the first editor in chief of the first Uzbek Soviet encyclopedia. Specialists under his leadership for the first time compiled municipalities for creating an encyclopedia, which was the first Soviet encyclopedia in Central Asia, and later served as an example for compiling encyclopedias in other Soviet Central Asian republics.

Editor-in-chief of the journal Social Sciences in Uzbekistan (1957–1974), which became the first periodical body in the field of the humanities in Central Asia. Already in those years, scientists and institutions of countries such as the USA, Germany, and Great Britain became subscribers to the journal, France, Japan, etc.

The first editor-in-chief of the magazine "Fan wa turmush" (Science and Life) (1957). Editor of a number of scientific publications: "History of Samarkand" in two volumes, "History of Bukhara", "History of Khwarazm", History of the Uzbek SSR from ancient times to the present day. Tashkent, 1974, "History of the Karakalpak Autonomous Soviet Socialist Republic" in two volumes. T., 1974. et al.

In 1967, a four-volume “History of the Uzbek SSR” in the Uzbek language was edited by IM Muminov. The publication of multi-volume stories of Uzbekistan was continued only 40 years later.

== Awards and honors ==
- Two Order of Lenin
- Two Order of the Red Banner of Labour (16 January 1950, 1954)
- Order of the Badge of Honour (1 March 1965)
- Order of Outstanding Merit (25 August 2003, posthumous)
- Biruni State Prize (1967)

== Literature ==
- Montgomery David, Review of Samarkand taarikhi by I. M. Muminov et al // The American historical review, volume 81, no. 4 (October, 1976).
- James Critchlow, Review of „Ŭzbek Sovet Entsiklopediiasi, Vols. 1-7: Ä-Nikelin. by I. M. Mŭminov”, // Slavic Review Vol. 37, No. 1 (March, 1978).
- Edward A.Allworth, The modern Uzbeks. From the fourteenth century to the present. A cultural history. Stanford: Hoover institution press, 1990, p. 245.
- Olivier Roy, The new Central Asia. The creation of nations. New York university press, 2000, p. 168.
