= Xushnud Xudayberdiyev =

Uzbek lawyer, blogger and politician

Xushnud Xudayberdiyev Хушнуд Худайбердиев
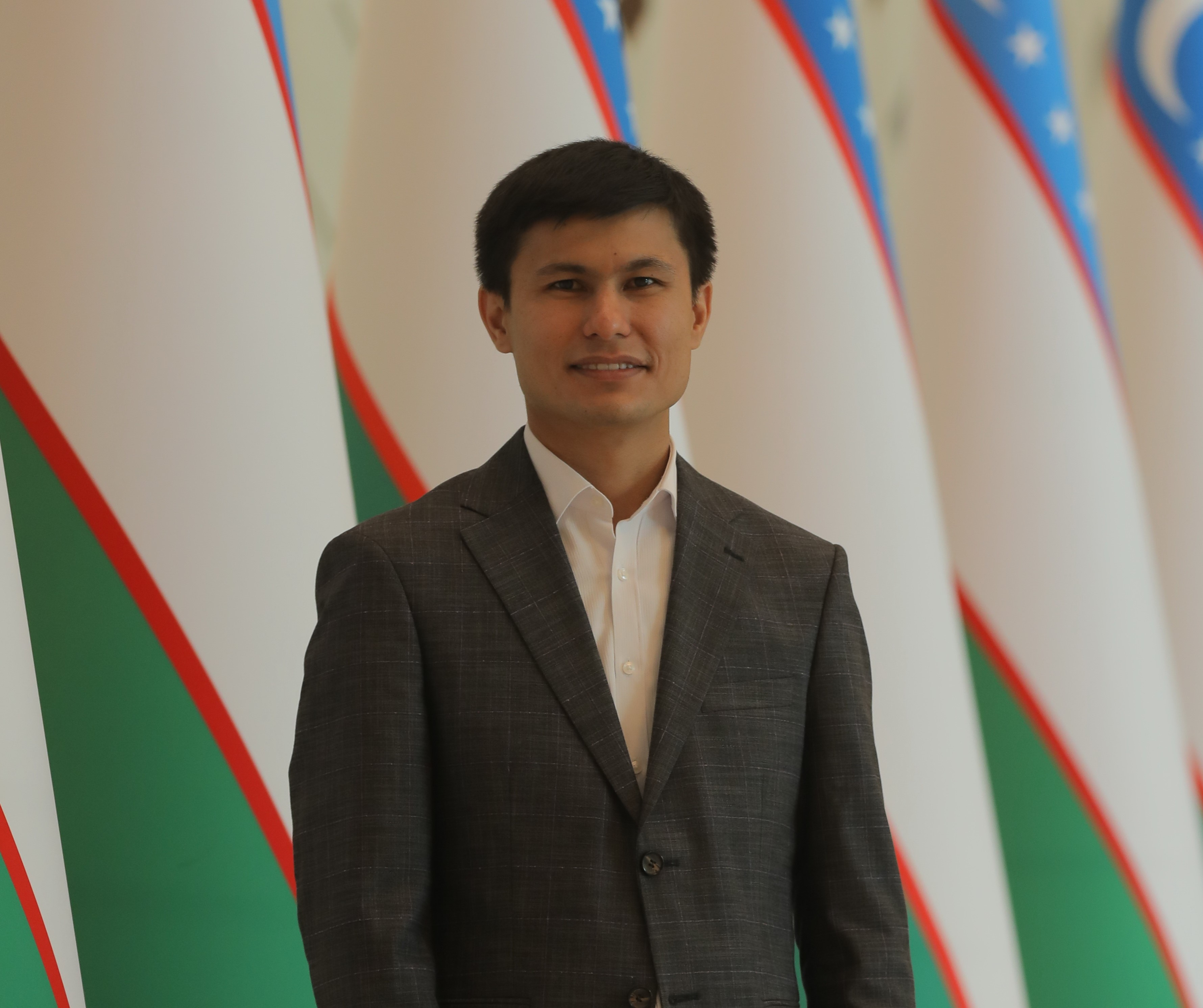

Deputy Head of the Communications Department of the Administration of the President of the Republic of Uzbekistan
- In office from October 15, 2026 – until now
- President: Shavkat Mirziyoyev
- Prime Minister: Abdulla Aripov
- Preceded by: Farruh Omonov

Director of the Public Fund for Support and Development of National Mass Media
- In office from October 10, 2019 – until June 30, 2020

First Deputy Director General of the National News Agency of Uzbekistan
- In office From August 7, 2023 – until October 15, 2026

Personal details
- Born: Xushnud G‘ayratovich Xudayberdiyev; 7 June 1989 (age 37) Chiroqchi District, Qashqadaryo Region, Uzbek SSR
- Spouse: Mehrinoz Abbosova
- Education: Tashkent State University of Law
- Awards: Oʻzbekiston belgisi (2016); Huquqiy targʻibot ishlari aʼlochisi (2016); Kelajak bunyodkori (2019)
- Website: Website; Telegram channel

Xushnud G‘ayratovich Xudayberdiyev (Note: While many Uzbek publications spell his last name as Xudoyberdiyev, officially his last name is spelled as Xudayberdiyev.) (Uzbek Latin: Xushnud G‘ayratovich Xudayberdiyev, Uzbek Cyrillic: Хушнуд Ғайратович Худайбердиев; (Russified form Khushnud Gayratovich Khudayberdiev; born 7 June 1989) is an Uzbek lawyer, blogger, state and public figure, and blogger. He is one of the experts of the Zakovat intellectual club. From October 15, 2026, Deputy Head of the Communications Department of the Administration of the President of the Republic of Uzbekistan.

Xushnud Xudayberdiyev was born on June 7, 1989, in the Chiroqchi district of the Kashkadarya region into an intellectual family. His nationality is Uzbek.

At the age of 5, he entered the 1st grade of secondary school No. 3 named after Habib Abdullaev in the Chiroqchi district. In 2003, he graduated from the 9th grade of Specialized Lyceum No. 2 in the Chirakchi district and continued his studies at the Academic Lyceum under the Tashkent State University of Law. In 2006, he was admitted to the bachelor's degree program at Tashkent State University of Law on a contract basis.

In 2010, he graduated from the Law Institute with honors. In 2010, he became a master's student at the Tashkent State University of Law, specializing in "Criminal Procedure; Criminalistics and Operational-Search Law; Forensic Science." In 2012, he successfully completed his master's degree.

From 2010 to 2013, he was a lecturer at the Tashkent State University of Law.

From 2013 to 2017, he served as a legal advisor to the legal department of the Federation of Trade Unions of Uzbekistan. Simultaneously, he served as the Chief Specialist of the Press Service of the General Prosecutor's Office of the Republic of Uzbekistan.

On December 26, 2019, he was appointed a member of the Republican Council for Higher Education.

From January 28 to July 1, 2020, he served as the director of the Public Fund for Support and Development of National Mass Media.

On July 1, 2020, he was appointed Deputy Director of the National News Agency of Uzbekistan.

On August 7, 2023, he was appointed First Deputy to the Director General of the National News Agency of Uzbekistan, Abdusaid Kuchimov.

On October 15, 2026, he was appointed Deputy Head of the Communications Department of the Administration of the President of the Republic of Uzbekistan.

Xudayberdiyev has received numerous awards and accolades throughout his career. In 2016, he was awarded the Oʻzbekiston belgisi (Badge of Uzbekistan) and became one of the first recipients of the Huquqiy targʻibot ishlari aʼlochisi (Legal Advocacy High Achiever) badge. In 2019, he was awarded the Kelajak bunyodkori (Builder of the Future) medal.

Xudayberdiyev is married to the Uzbek poet Mehrinoz Abbosova. The couple have a son.
