= Youth Affairs Agency of the Republic of Uzbekistan =

Youth Affairs Agency
- Youth Affairs Agency of the Republic of Uzbekistan

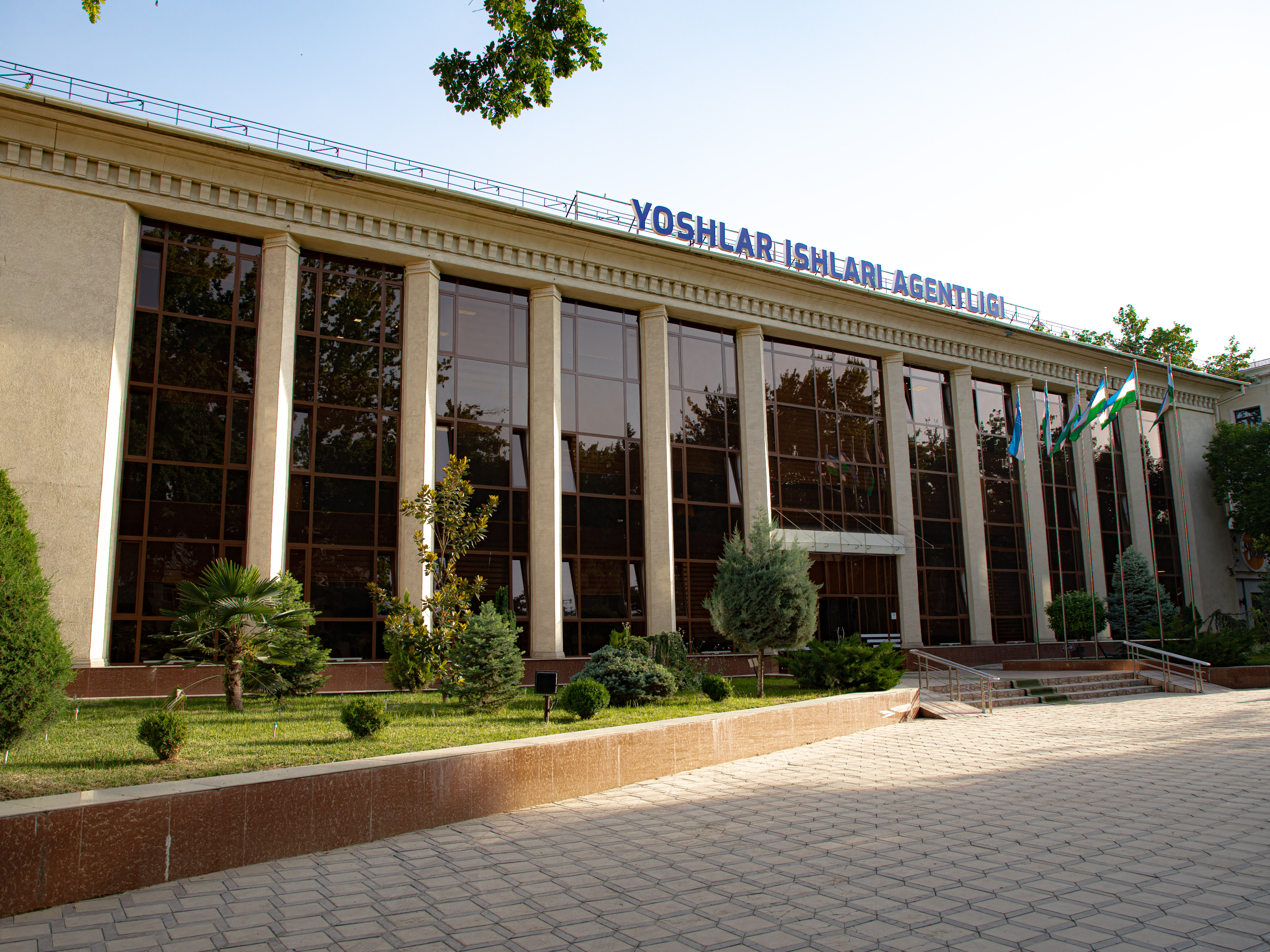
- Youth Affairs Agency building
- Predecessor: Kamolot youth social movement
- Formation: June 30, 2020; 6 years ago
- Type: Public administration body
- Legal status: Active
- Headquarters: 11 a Alisher Navoi street, Tashkent
- Coordinates: 41.320043°N 69.262507°E
- Region served: Uzbekistan
- Official language: Uzbek language, Russian language
- Direktor: Alisher Saʼdullayev
- Website: gov.uz/oz/yoshlar

The Youth Affairs Agency under the Cabinet of Ministers of the Republic of Uzbekistan is a government agency responsible for implementing state youth policy and coordinating youth affairs in Uzbekistan.

== History ==
- It was founded in 1924 as the Uzbek SSR branch of the All-Union Leninist Young Communist League.
- In 1991, it was reorganized as the Youth Union of Uzbekistan.
- In April 1996, it was reorganized as the Kamolot Foundation, and in 2001 it became the Kamolot Youth Social Movement. The organization operated through mandatory contributions equal to 8 percent of the unified tax payment assessed on small businesses (excluding trade enterprises) under mutual support agreements.
- In 2017, it was reorganized as the Youth Union of Uzbekistan.
- In 2020, it was reorganized as the Youth Affairs Agency.
- On 30 December 2022, the Youth Affairs Agency and the Ministry of Sports of Uzbekistan were merged to create the Ministry of Youth Policy and Sports of the Republic of Uzbekistan.
- In 2024, the Ministry of Youth Policy and Sports was reorganized as the Ministry of Sports, and the Youth Affairs Agency was placed under the Cabinet of Ministers of the Republic of Uzbekistan.

== Leaders ==
- 2006–2010 – Aziz Alimov
- 2010–2017 – Bakhodir Ganiyev
- 2017 – Sarvar Ashurov
- 2017 – Odiljon Tojiyev
- 2017–2019 – Qahramon Quronboyev
- 2019–present – Alisher Saʼdullayev
