= National Encyclopedia of Uzbekistan =

National encyclopedia

- Language: Uzbek
- Subject: General
- Genre: Reference encyclopaedia
- Publisher: National Encyclopedia of Uzbekistan State Scientific Publishing House
- Publication date: 2000-2005
- Publication place: Uzbekistan
- Media type: 12 volumes (hardbound)

The National Encyclopedia of Uzbekistan (Uzbek: Oʻzbekiston milliy ensiklopediyasi, OʻzME, Ўзбекистон миллий энциклопедияси, ЎзМЭ) is a general-knowledge encyclopedia written in Uzbek. The majority of the articles in the National Encyclopedia were directly taken from the Uzbek Soviet Encyclopedia.

While the Uzbek Soviet Encyclopedia was published in 14 volumes, the National Encyclopedia of Uzbekistan has only 12 volumes. The first volume of the National Encyclopedia was published in 2000. The final 12th volume was published in 2006.

== History ==
Agency of Information and Mass Communications Letter to WMF on releasing OʻzME under a CC BY 4.0 license

The National Encyclopedia of Uzbekistan was published in Tashkent from 2000 to 2005 by the National Encyclopedia of Uzbekistan State Scientific Publishing House. The encyclopedia was printed in Cyrillic even though it was published long after Uzbekistan introduced the Latin script to Uzbek. In 2013, all of the articles of the National Encyclopedia were added to the Uzbek Wikipedia with the help of a bot. In 2022, the Agency of Information and Mass Communications under the Administration of the President of the Republic of Uzbekistan officially released the OʻzME under a CC BY 4.0 license.

== Content ==
The National Encyclopedia of Uzbekistan has about 50,000 entries. The majority of the articles in the National Encyclopedia were directly taken from the Uzbek Soviet Encyclopedia. The bulk of the National Encyclopedia (40 percent) is devoted to subjects about Uzbekistan. About 60 percent of the articles are on social sciences and the other 40 percent are on natural sciences. The 12th volume is entirely dedicated to subjects about Uzbekistan.

The encyclopedia praises Islam Karimov, the late president of Uzbekistan, and his administration. The first volume starts with a congratulatory letter from Karimov.

== Volumes ==
Volume	Year	Article coverage
1	2000	A—Beshbaliq
2	2001	Beshik—Gidrofizika (hydrophysics)
3	2002	Gidrofiliya—Zebralar
4	2002	Zebunniso—Konigil
5	2003	Konimex—Mirzoqush
6	2003	Miriy—Parxish
7	2004	Parchin—Soliq
8	2004	Solnoma—Toʻytepa
9	2005	Toʻychi Hofiz—Sharshara
10	2005	Sharq—Qizilqum
11	2005	Qizilqumit (Kyzylkumite)—Hoʻrmuz
12	2006	Editorial board

== See also ==
- Uzbek Soviet Encyclopedia
- Culture of Uzbekistan
- Uzbek literature
