= Toqi Sarrofon =

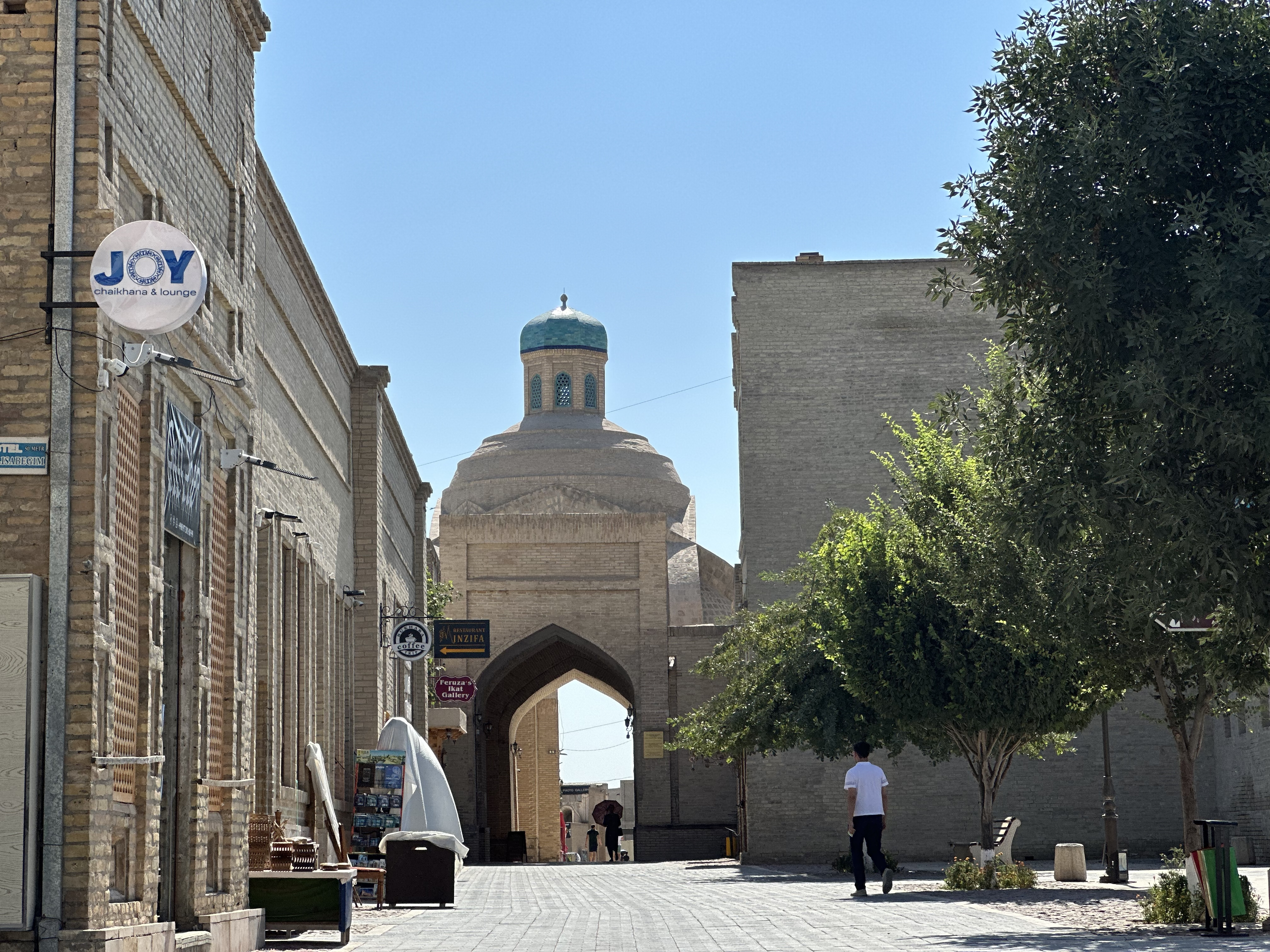
- Interactive map of the Toqi Sarrofon area

General information
- Architectural style: Central Asian architecture
- Location: Bukhara, Uzbekistan
- Coordinates: 39.77265°N 64.41859°E1
- Year built: 1534-1535
- Completed: 1535
- Renovated: 1980
- Owner: State property. Bukhara Region Cultural Heritage Administration

Height
- Height: 16.55 m (outer dome height)

Technical details
- Material: Brick, wood, stone and gypsum
- Size: 25x24 m (plan)
- Floor count: 1

Toqi Sarrofon (Persian: طاق صرافان, lit. 'money changers' dome') is an architectural monument and one of the main trade centers for money exchange in Bukhara. This architectural monument was built in 1534-1535 by the order of the Shaybanid ruler Ubaydullah Khan. It is currently included in the national register of immovable property of the material and cultural heritage of Uzbekistan.

== History ==
It was one of the four largest trade domes built during the reign of the Shaybanid dynasty in the Khanate of Bukhara in the 16th century. This trade center was built in the city part of Bukhara, on the Shohrud canal. There were shops for money exchange, a mosque and a Sarrafon bathhouse in this dome. Toqi Sarrofon was famous as the money changers' dome, because mostly money changers sat there and exchanged foreign currency and made money.

The word toq is an ancient architectural term, meaning a building and a semi-circular vault in Arabic. In the Bukhara Khanate, a covered market was called a toq. Toqi Sarrofon was also one of such market domes. Sarrof means a money maker. Research shows that people lived in this market area in the 9th century during the Samanid period.There is information that a fire occurred here in the 13th century and that the fire was related to the activities of Genghis Khan.

During the Shaybanid period, Bukhara became a center of private entrepreneurship, lending and money exchange. There were houses, trade domes, caravanserais, mosques, bathhouses and others related to the name of money changers in Bukhara. The inscription above the door of the dome was rebuilt in 1980. The bookcase is decorated with verse 103 of the Nisa surah of the Quran in a complex suls script in blue, and the verse is written in gold. The inscription above the door of the mosque of Toqi Sarrofon reads “This building was completed in 1534-1535 during the reign of Ubaydullah Bahodir Khan”. This inscription was written by Muhammad Darvish Qo’noq, a Bukhara master of calligraphy. During the restoration works in the 1980s, the inscriptions on the walls of the mosque were rebuilt and restored. Today there are handicraft workshops and trade stalls operating in this dome.

== Architecture ==
Toqi Sarrofon is built of baked brick, wood, stone and gypsum. Toqi Sarrofon is the smallest dome. It consists of a dome made of four niches. The dome of Toqi Sarrofon is distinguished by a "four-arch" dome. Toqi Sarrofon is located at the intersection of two streets, one of which leads to Registan. The dome of this dome is built on four strong portals that intersect each other. A road covered with a dome in the style of “four-arch”, characteristic of Bukhara architecture, passed under the portals. The building's ornaments have not survived to this day, only the mosaic remains of the canopies were found on the top of the entrance and exit of the mosque. The building has 8 corners (plan 25x24 meters), the inner diameter of the dome is 12 meters, the outer dome height is 16.55 meters, it is installed on 4 domes and covers the southern part of the city. In the second half of the 16th century, a mosque was added to one of the four cut corners of the hall, a Sarrofon bathhouse to another, and money changers shops to the remaining two.
