= Uzbek Wikipedia =

Uzbek-language edition of Wikipedia

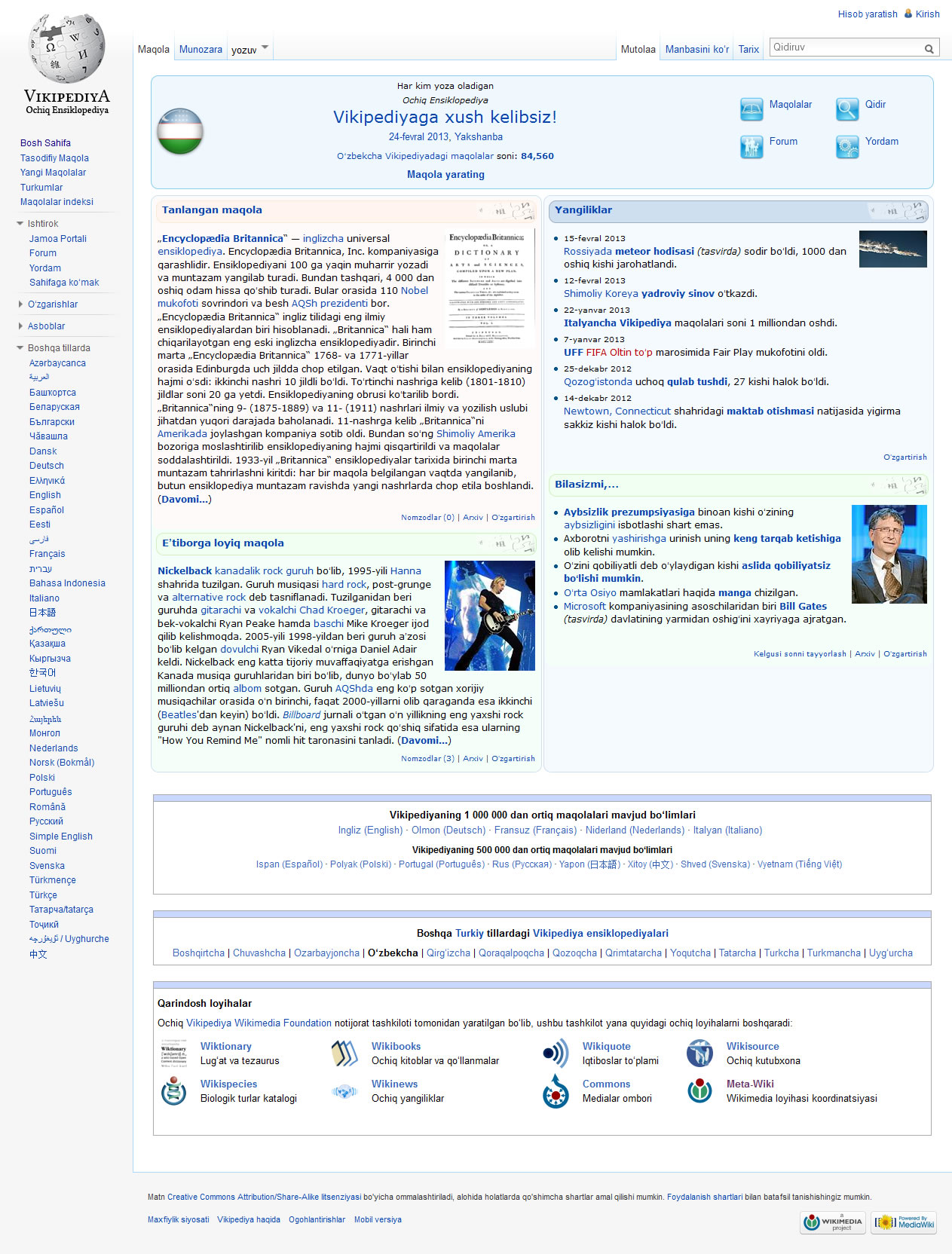
- Screenshot The homepage of the Uzbek Wikipedia.
- Website type: Internet encyclopedia project
- Available in: Uzbek
- Owner: Wikimedia Foundation
- Website: uz.wikipedia.org
- Commercial: Charitable
- Registration: Optional
- Content license: Creative Commons Attribution/ Share-Alike 4.0 (most text also dual-licensed under GFDL); Media licensing varies

The Uzbek Wikipedia (Uzbek: Oʻzbekcha Vikipediya) is the Uzbek-language edition of Wikipedia, founded on December 21, 2003. Articles in the Uzbek-language edition are primarily written in Latin script. In August 2012, a Latin-to-Cyrillic converter was added to allow users to view Uzbek Wikipedia's pages in both Latin and Cyrillic scripts.

Although Uzbek is estimated to be spoken by 35 million people and Uzbekistan has approximately 17 million internet users, there are few active editors on Uzbek Wikipedia, and many articles lack detailed citations or sourcing. Since early 2012, the number of active users and article structures has increased notably, and the number of visits to the Uzbek encyclopedia has also risen. From 2019 to May 2022, the number of active users more than doubled, surpassing 500.

In early 2013, Uzbek Wikipedia ranked first among different editions of Wikipedia in annual page-view growth. Currently, the number of articles on the Uzbek Wikipedia is 368,732, making it the 39th-largest Wikipedia.

In late 2011, the Uzbek Wikipedia was blocked in Uzbekistan, and the reasons behind the blockage were not disclosed. The block was not strictly enforced, as Wikipedia could still be accessed via a HTTPS (Hypertext Transfer Protocol Secure) connection. In 2013, Google started indexing pages of the Uzbek Wikipedia with HTTPS by default. Currently, users in Uzbekistan are able to access Wikipedia. In 2022, the WikiStipendiya project began, in collaboration with the Uzbek government. This led to significant growth in this Wikipedia's article count, encyclopedic coverage, quality, and reach in Uzbek society.

== History ==
The Uzbek Wikipedia was launched on 21 December 2003, and the first edit to the encyclopedia's main page was made on the same day. It remained largely inactive throughout 2004 but began to grow in 2005.

The Uzbek Wikipedia was blocked in Uzbekistan around the beginning of October 2011. Despite the block, the encyclopedia continued to expand exponentially in 2012. During that year, a bot was used to create a large number of articles. In 2013, a second bot added all of the entries from the National Encyclopedia of Uzbekistan to the Uzbek Wikipedia.

A mirror of the Uzbek Wikipedia was established at wiki.zn.uz in 2008 with the aim of reducing international data traffic for internet users in Uzbekistan. The mirror has, however, been offline since June 2012.

=== Wikiconferences ===
In 2007, the first Wikiconference (Uzbek: Vikimajlis) of Uzbek Wikipedia editors was held at the Tashkent University of Information Technologies. Participants included those who had never edited Wikipedia before.

=== WikiSummer ===
In 2008, a WikiSummer (Uzbek: VikiYoz; 'yoz' means both 'summer' and 'to write' in Uzbek) contest was organised with the goal of contributing to the expansion and development of the Uzbek Wikipedia. However, there was little interest shown, and the contest was considered unsuccessful. The contest was financially supported by Uzinfocom, an agency of the State Committee of Communication, Informatisation, and Telecommunications Technology of Uzbekistan.

=== OzodWiki ===
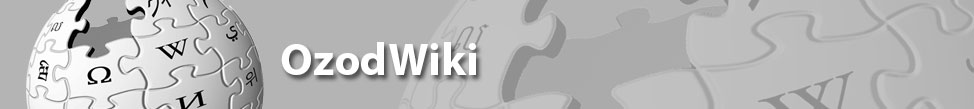
Banner of the OzodWiki project

In February 2014, RFE/RL's Uzbek Service, known locally as Ozodlik radiosi, launched the OzodWiki project to contribute to the development of the Uzbek Wikipedia. A wide range of articles, including interviews with active editors, reviews of existing articles, and lessons on editing Wikipedia were published as part of the project. In addition, selected words and phrases used in Ozodlik Radiosi's reports were hyperlinked to corresponding entries in the Uzbek Wikipedia to popularize the encyclopedia. The OzodWiki project was "mutually beneficial, enabling Ozodlik users to click through to expanded information resources while popularizing Wikipedia by driving new topics and audience their way." A total of 33 unique articles were published as part of the project. The final OzodWiki article was published in January 2016.

In a short time, the OzodWiki project had a positive impact on the Uzbek Wikipedia. While it is unlikely that all of the changes that took place after the launch of OzodWiki were a direct result of the project, most of these changes occurred while the project was running. While the main page of the Uzbek Wikipedia was viewed 20,368 times in January 2014, it was viewed 56,274 times in March of the same year. In April 2013, the main page was visited only 12,134 times, but in April 2014, it was viewed a record 136,592 times.

=== WikiStipendiya ===
On 20 May 2022, the Agency for Youth Affairs of the Republic of Uzbekistan launched the WikiStipendiya edit-a-thon. The project's name is a portmanteau of 'wiki' and 'stipendiya' (scholarship). The Agency of Information and Mass Communications collaborated with the Council of Young Artists and Wikimedians of the Uzbek language User Group to organise this event. The edit-a-thon was inspired by a decree of Shavkat Mirziyoyev on improving the presence of the Uzbek language in the digital world.

It encouraged content creation on the Uzbek Wikipedia, particularly by students, and aimed to increase the number of editors on Uzbek-language wikis.

Before 2022, government agencies reviewed Uzbek Wikipedia and created various sample articles, recognising that Uzbek Wikipedia was part of the digital world. After the inspections, people from the Youth Affairs Agency contacted Uzbek admins and Wikipedians about a potential collaboration, which materialised in the WikiStipendiya contest in 2022. Notably, Uzbek President Shavkat Mirziyoyev congratulated the Uzbek community for the contest in a speech on 30 June 2022.

Since the beginning of the contest, the number of new articles soared to 200–400 articles per day, and many vital articles were created. On 3 July 2022, Uzbek Wikipedia reached 150,000 articles. On 2 August 2022, Uzbek reached 159,000 articles after a drive to create articles about archaeological sites in Uzbekistan resulted in nearly 3,000 articles that day. In the first week of August, Uzbek Wikipedia conducted the WikiOromgoh (WikiCamp) programme, hosted by the Agency for Youth Affairs and the local Wikimedians, aimed at young Wikipedians. The project, a part of WikiStipendiya, added more than 8,000 articles on many topics in one week.

On 26 November 2022, Uzbek Wikipedia reached 200,000 articles, after several thousand articles—many of them about settlements in Turkey, Azerbaijan, and Tajikistan, as well as on many other topics—were added during the second WikiCamp, which took place from 23 to 29 November 2022.

== Policies ==
=== Script ===
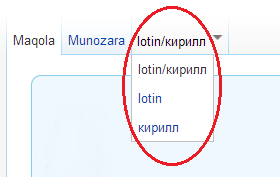
The Latin-to-Cyrillic converter on the Uzbek Wikipedia

While articles in the Uzbek Wikipedia are written using the Latin script, historically the Uzbek language has used many different alphabets. Before 1928, Uzbek was written in an Arabic-based alphabet by the literate population. Between 1928 and 1940, it started being written in a Latin alphabet which was different from the Latin alphabet that is used today. Starting from 1940, Uzbek began to be written in the Cyrillic alphabet, which remained the predominant form of writing until 1993.

The 'wikifier' function, which allows editors to convert Cyrillic text into Latin while editing

A new Latin alphabet was introduced to Uzbek after Uzbekistan gained independence from the Soviet Union. Currently, the Latin script is used in school and university textbooks, some newspapers, and some official papers. Since 2004, some official websites have switched over to using the Latin script when writing in Uzbek. However, the use of Cyrillic is still widespread, especially among older Uzbeks and among Uzbeks who live in other countries.

Currently, the Uzbek Wikipedia has a function ('vikifikator', literally 'wikifier') that allows editors to easily convert Cyrillic text into Latin while editing. In August 2012, a Latin-to-Cyrillic converter was added to allow users to view Uzbek Wikipedia's pages in both the Latin and Cyrillic scripts.

=== Other policies ===
Whereas in the English Wikipedia, autoconfirmed status is required to move pages, edit semi-protected pages, and upload files, in the Uzbek edition, these actions are not restricted. Currently, there are 9 administrators on the Uzbek Wikipedia.

== Content ==
In 2012, the Uzbek Wikipedia started to experience rapid growth despite being blocked in Uzbekistan. Since that time, the number of well-written articles on important subjects has increased significantly. In 2013, the coverage of the Uzbek Wikipedia expanded noticeably after all of the articles of the National Encyclopedia of Uzbekistan were added to it using a bot. Currently, most articles on the Uzbek Wikipedia are about populated places, astronomical objects, people, music, and football. Many articles about Uzbekistan have been written since the WikiStipendiya article contest, including articles about recent political events and social issues, which the Wikipedia once lacked.

Like in many other Wikipedias, Uzbek Wikipedia editors jointly determine featured and good articles. Currently, there are 11 featured and 22 good articles on the Uzbek Wikipedia. The most comprehensive articles are entries about stars, philosophy, South Korea, Tehran, Aleppo, Karabulak, Texas, Encyclopædia Britannica, Ali-Shir Nava'i, Cristiano Ronaldo, and the British Empire.

In Uzbekistan, despite the Cyrillic alphabet being replaced by a Latin one in 1992, Cyrillic continues to be used very widely in the country. Due to this, there is still some use of Cyrillic in the Uzbek Wikipedia; there are pages written in the Cyrillic alphabet instead of Latin or that exhibit a mixed use of both. For example, the page about the Chinese leader Mao Zedong is written mostly in Cyrillic, except for a few captions.

Since the beginning of the WikiStipendiya article contest, the quality and variety of articles on the Uzbek Wikipedia have improved. Many significant articles have been added, more people have been inspired to contribute to the encyclopedia, and more people feel confident to use the encyclopedia for information.

== Statistics ==
The number of articles in the Uzbek Wikipedia reached 10,000 on 5 June 2012. The 10,000th article was on the compass. A month later, on 5 July 2012, the article count of the encyclopedia reached 20,000. The 20,000th article was on the topic of meteorology. The Uzbek Wikipedia reached 50,000 articles on 8 November 2012. The 50,000th article was on quadratic equations. The encyclopedia reached 100,000 articles on 20 March 2013. The 100,000th article was on labor force. These increases in the number of articles were mostly achieved with the help of bots.

The growth rate of page views of the Uzbek, Russian, and English Wikipedia in Uzbekistan.

As of 17 October 2026, the Uzbek Wikipedia has 368,732 articles. There are 315,320 users, 649 of whom have made at least one edit in the last 30 days. At the moment, only 9 users have administrator rights. The total number of pages on the Uzbek Wikipedia (including talk pages, categories, etc.) is 1,314,425. The total number of edits is 6,308,781. The editing depth of the Uzbek Wikipedia, which is a rough indicator of the encyclopedia collaborative quality, is 31.6. Based on the List of articles every Wikipedia should have, the Uzbek Wikipedia ranks 64th. Since 2018, the number of active users has more than doubled, from 785 in 2018 to nearly 2,000 in 2021, and the number of page views has increased to even 9 million pageviews in 2022. In November 2022, the number of pageviews of the Uzbek Wikipedia in Uzbekistan surpassed those of Russian for the first time, with Uzbek garnering 11.4 million pageviews in Uzbekistan during this month.

There are also approximately 60 thousand page views each per month on Uzbek Wikipedia from both Kyrgyzstan and Kazakhstan, due to the great amount of Uzbeks living there. Some thousands of pageviews are also recorded in Turkmenistan and Tajikistan, where there are many noteworthy Uzbek minorities.

Origin of views (June 2018) Source
Uzbekistan	51.4%
United States	33.5%
Russia	3.8%
China	3.6%
France	3.1%
Ukraine	1.3%
Netherlands	1.0%
Other	2.0%

Date	Articles
15 January 2006	100
24 May 2006	500
28 May 2006	1,000
5 June 2012	10,000
5 July 2012	20,000
31 July 2012	30,000
27 August 2012	40,000
8 November 2012	50,000
29 November 2012	60,000
4 January 2013	70,000
13 February 2013	80,000
10 March 2013	90,000
20 March 2013	100,000
26 November 2022	200,000
29 June 2024	300,000
now	368,732

== Censorship ==
The entire Wikipedia was briefly blocked twice in Uzbekistan, in 2007 and 2008. The Uzbek Wikipedia was blocked in Uzbekistan around the end of September and the beginning of October 2011, but it only caught the attention of the international press in late February 2012, following RFE/RL's report about the blockage on 16 February 2012. Initially, internet users in Uzbekistan trying to access Uzbek-language pages were redirected to the msn.com page, which belonged to Microsoft. Later, the pages of the encyclopedia simply failed to load. Users in Uzbekistan could easily open Wikipedia articles in other languages; only Uzbek-language articles were blocked.

The reason for the blockage of the Uzbek Wikipedia has not been disclosed. Some expressed the view that the encyclopedia had been blocked because the Uzbek government was concerned about the appearance of articles critical of its actions. Sarah Kendzior, an American anthropologist, speculated that the Uzbek Wikipedia had been blocked simply as an 'act of showmanship', because the government of Uzbekistan sees Uzbek-language content as subject to its jurisdiction.

Despite the blockage, articles on the Uzbek Wikipedia could be accessed via an HTTPS connection. Therefore, in 2013, Google started indexing pages of the Uzbek Wikipedia with HTTPS by default, and visitors to the Uzbek Wikipedia began to be automatically connected through HTTPS. Between 2013 and 2019, users in Uzbekistan could generally access pages of the Uzbek Wikipedia without major problems. In May 2019, the government of Uzbekistan unblocked several news and rights websites, including Voice of America, BBC's Uzbek Service, Amnesty International, and Human Rights Watch. Users in Uzbekistan have not faced any issues while accessing the Uzbek Wikipedia since then.
