= Namangan State University =

University in Namangan, Uzbekistan

- Namangan davlat universiteti
- Entrance gate of Namangan State University
- Established: 1942
- Officer in charge: 2019
- Rector: Kyrgyzboyev Abdugaffar Karimjonovich
- Students: 25037
- Undergraduates: 18500
- Postgraduates: 200
- Location: Namangan, Namangan Region, Uzbekistan; 40.98531°N 71.695°E
- Website: www.namdu.uz

Namangan State University (NamSU) was established in 1942 as a pedagogical institute. It is in Namangan province which has almost 2.8 mln population with 7900 km2 area located in eastern part on Uzbekistan, considered one of the strategically important area. Nowadays NamSU has over 28,547 students in bachelor's and master's degree programs. NamSU has 600 teaching staff which 46% of them have PhD and doctoral levels degrees. NamSU offers various courses of study, including 54 bachelor educational programs, 15 master's specialization programs, 10 programs for full-time doctorate and another 15 programs for part-time doctorate. The university trains high-skilled specialists in languages (Uzbek, Russian, English, German), literature, social sciences, political sciences, history, archive studies, pedagogy, psychology, education, preschool education, sport, applied art, music education, geography, economy, mathematics, applied mathematics, physics, chemistry, biology, technical sciences, tourism, hotel management, information technology and library studies. The university have also newly established dual degree programs in medicine with Ural Medical University (Russia).

The university has academic relationships with more than 40 advanced universities in Europe, Asia countries. Every year the teaching staff and students attend different scientific events and spend academic visits in advanced universities in developed countries. NamSU was a national coordinator for TuCAHEA Tempus project (www.tucahea.org), participated in IMEP, UZDOC 2.0 and Erasmus+ projects.
