= Great Soviet Encyclopedia =

1926–1990 encyclopedia in Soviet Union

- Original title: Большая советская энциклопедия
- Language: Russian
- Subject: General
- Publisher: Sovetskaya Entsiklopediya
- Publication date: 1926–1981 (printed version)
- Media type: 30 volumes (hardbound) in 1981
- OCLC: 14476314
- Followed by: Great Russian Encyclopedia
- Website: bse.sci-lib.com

The Great Soviet Encyclopedia (GSE; Russian: Больша́я сове́тская энциклопе́дия, БСЭ, romanized: Bolshaya sovetskaya entsiklopediya, BSE) is one of the largest Russian-language encyclopedias, published in the Soviet Union from 1926 to 1990. After 2002, the encyclopedia's data was partially included into the later Great Russian Encyclopedia in an updated and revised form. The GSE claimed to be "the first Marxist–Leninist general-purpose encyclopedia".

== Origins ==
The idea of the Great Soviet Encyclopedia emerged in 1923 on the initiative of Otto Schmidt, a member of the Russian Academy of Sciences. In early 1924 Schmidt worked with a group which included Mikhail Pokrovsky, (rector of the Institute of Red Professors), Nikolai Meshcheryakov (Former head of the Glavit, the State Administration of Publishing Affairs), Valery Bryusov (poet), Veniamin Kagan (mathematician) and Konstantin Kuzminsky to draw up a proposal which was agreed to in April 1924. Also involved was Anatoly Lunacharsky, People's Commissar of Education (Narkompros), who had previously been involved with a proposal by Alexander Bogdanov and Maxim Gorky to produce a Workers' Encyclopedia.

== Editions ==
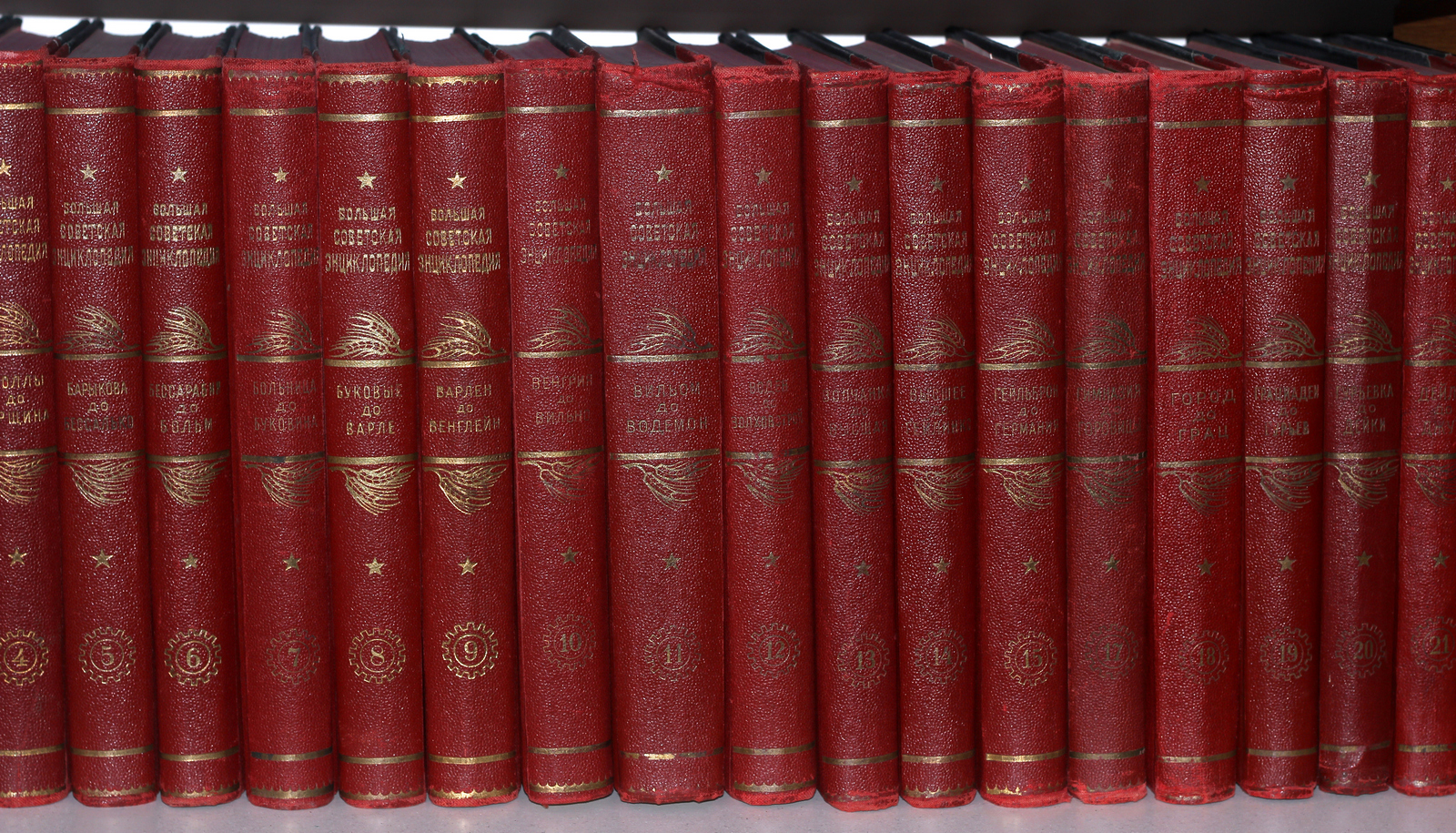
The first edition of the Great Soviet Encyclopedia, from 1927

There were three editions. The first edition of 65 volumes (65,000 entries, plus a supplementary volume about the Soviet Union) was published during 1926–1947, with the release of the initial volume being announced by the Soviet government on March 23, 1926, with a projection of all 30 volumes to be available within six years. The chief editor was Otto Schmidt until 1941. The second edition of 50 volumes (100,000 entries, plus a supplementary volume) was published in 1950–1958, with chief editors Sergei Vavilov (until 1951) and Boris Vvedensky (until 1969); two index volumes to this edition were published in 1960. The third edition of 1969–1978 contains 30 volumes (100,000 entries, plus an index volume issued in 1981). Volume 24 is in two books, one being a full-sized book about the USSR, all with about 21 million words, and the chief editor being Alexander Prokhorov (since 1969). In the third edition, much attention was paid to the philosophical problems of natural sciences, physical and chemical sciences, and mathematical methods in various branches of knowledge.

From 1957 to 1990, the Yearbook of the Great Soviet Encyclopedia was released annually with up-to-date articles about the Soviet Union and all countries of the world. The first online edition, an exact replica of text and graphics of the third (so-called Red) edition, was published by Rubricon.com in 2000.

== Editors ==
Editors and contributors to the GSE included a number of leading Soviet scientists and politicians:

- Georgy Aleksandrov (author of articles on materialism, first edition, and idealism, second edition)
- Hamid Alimjan
- Victor Ambartsumian
- Valentin Asmus (author of articles on metaphysics, Plato, Schopenhauer, Schleiermacher, Chernyshevsky and Spengler, first edition)
- Nikolai Baibakov
- Mykola Bazhan
- Walter Benjamin (author of article on Goethe, first edition)
- Maia Berzina
- Nikolay Bogolyubov
- Andrei Bubnov (executed in 1938)
- Nikolai Bukharin (executed in 1938)
- Nikolai Burdenko
- Abram Deborin (author of article on Hegel, first edition)
- Mikhail Frunze
- Victor Glushkov
- Igor Grabar
- Mikhail Grushevsky (author of article on Galicia (Eastern Europe), first edition)
- Hugo Huppert (author of article on Heinrich von Kleist, first edition)
- Veniamin Kagan
- Lev Kamenev (executed in 1936, author of article on Herzen, first edition)
- Ivan Knunyants
- Andrei Kolmogorov
- Gleb Krzhizhanovsky
- Nikolay Kun
- Valerian Kuybyshev
- Pavel Lebedev-Polianskii
- Solomon Lozovsky (author of article on Popular Front, first edition)
- György Lukács (author of articles on Nietzsche and novel, first edition)
- Anatoly Lunacharsky (author of articles on Shakespeare, Dostoyevsky, Gorky, Belinsky, Hamann, Hasenclever, Bohemianism, Bab, Garibaldi, Hausenstein, first edition)
- Nikolai Meshcheryakov (author of articles on Bolsheviks, Etienne Cabet and Gleb Uspensky, first edition)
- Mark Borisovich Mitin (purported author of article on dialectical materialism, first edition, which was in fact authored by Jan Sten before his purge)
- Vladimir Obruchev
- Aleksandr Oparin
- Valerian Pereverzev (author of article on Gogol, first edition)
- Wilhelm Pieck (author of articles on Karl Liebknecht and Wilhelm Liebknecht, first edition)
- Mikhail Pokrovsky (author of articles on bureaucratism, Julius Caesar, Entente and the biographies of most Tsars, first edition)
- Yuri Prokhorov
- Karl Radek (executed in 1939, author of articles on Victor Adler, Africa, Bavarian Soviet Republic, Berlin–Baghdad railway, Otto Bauer, August Bebel, Belgium, Conference of the Three Internationals, Eduard Bernstein, Otto von Bismarck, Ulrich von Brockdorff-Rantzau, Emperor Wilhelm II, Germany during World War I, German Revolution of 1918–1919, Rudolf Hilferding and Paul von Hindenburg, first edition)
- Otto Schmidt
- Nikolai Semashko
- Alexander Sergeevich Serebrovsky (co-author of article on genetics, first edition)
- Sergei Skazkin (author of articles on History of Germany, first edition, and Catholicism, third edition)
- Ivan Sollertinsky (author of article on drama, first edition)
- Pēteris Stučka (author of article on democracy, first edition)
- Nikolai Vavilov (author of articles on genetics and eugenics, first edition)
- Kliment Voroshilov
- David Zaslavsky (author of article on Shchedrin, first edition)
- Grigory Zinoviev (executed in 1936, author of article on the Moscow uprising of 1905, first edition)

== Role and purpose in Soviet society ==
The foreword to the first volume of the GSE (2nd ed.) proclaims "The Soviet Union has become the center of the civilized world." The GSE, along with all other books and other media and communications with the public, was directed toward the "furtherance of the aims of the party and the state." The 1949 decree issued for the production of the second edition of the GSE directed:

The second edition of the Great Soviet Encyclopedia should elucidate widely the world-historical victories of socialism in our country, which have been attained in the U.S.S.R. in the provinces of economics, science, culture, and art. ... With exhaustive completeness it must show the superiority of socialist culture over the culture of the capitalist world. Operating on Marxist-Leninist theory, the encyclopedia should give a party criticism of contemporary bourgeois tendencies in various provinces of science and technics.

The foreword to the GSE (3rd ed.) expanded on that mission, paying particular attention to developments in science and technology: nuclear engineering, space technology, atomic physics, polymer chemistry, and radio electronics; also detailing the history and activities of the Russian revolutionary movement, the development of the labor movement worldwide and summarizing Marxist scholarship on political economy, sociology, and political science. In support of that mission, the GSE (2nd ed.) described as the role of education:

To develop in children's minds the Communist morality, ideology, and Soviet patriotism; to inspire unshakable love toward the Soviet fatherland, the Communist party, and its leaders; to propagate Bolshevik vigilance; to put an emphasis on internationalist education; to strengthen Bolshevik willpower and character, as well as courage, capacity for resisting adversity and conquering obstacles; to develop self-discipline; and to encourage physical and aesthetic culture.

The third edition of the GSE subsequently expanded on the role of education:

Education is essential to preparing for life and work. It is the basic means by which people come to know and acquire culture, and it is the foundation of culture's development...The Soviet education rests on the principles of the unity of education and communist upbringing; cooperation among the school, the family, and the society in bringing up young people; and the linkage of education and training to life and the practical experience of building communism. The underlying principles of the Soviet system of public education include a scientific approach to and continual improvement of education on the basis of the latest achievements in science, technology and culture; a humanistic and highly moral orientation in education and upbringing; and co-education of both sexes, secular education which excludes the influence of religion.

Based on his extensive talks with the editors of the GSE, to whom he was granted unprecedented access, William Benton, publisher of the Encyclopædia Britannica, wrote the following in observation of the GSE's chief editor B. A. Vvedensky stating their compliance with the 1949 decree of the Council of Ministers:

It is just this simple for the Soviet board of editors. They are working under a government directive that orders them to orient their encyclopedia as sharply as a political tract. The encyclopedia was thus planned to provide the intellectual underpinning for the Soviet world offensive in the duel for men's minds. The Soviet government ordered it as a fighting propaganda weapon. And the government attaches such importance to its political role that its board of editors is chosen by and is responsible only to the high Council of Ministers itself.

== Translations ==
=== English ===
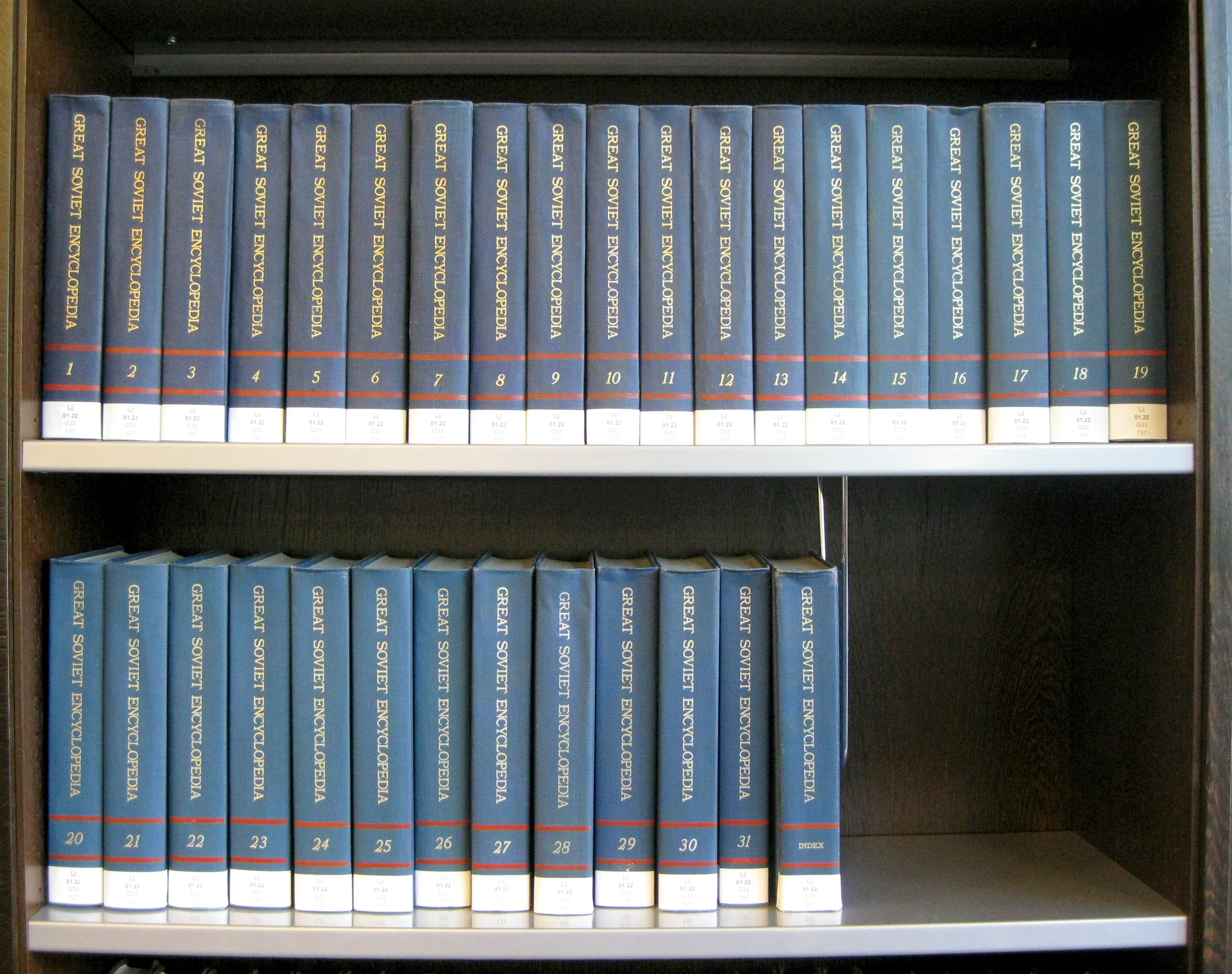
Complete set of an English-language version of the Great Soviet Encyclopedia

The third edition was translated and published into English in 31 volumes between 1974 and 1983 by Macmillan Publishers. Each volume was translated separately, requiring use of the index to locate specific items.

=== Greek ===
The third edition was translated into Greek and published in 34 volumes between 1977 and 1983 by the publishing company Akadimos (owned by Giannis Giannikos), which had also translated various Soviet encyclopedias and literature. All articles that were related to Greece or Greek history, culture and society were expanded and hundreds of new ones were written especially for the Greek edition. Each article written especially in the Greek edition is marked with the note "Greek version supplement" (or "Συμπλήρωμα ελληνικής έκδοσης" as written in the Greek translation).

Finally, a supplementary volume covering the 1980s was published in 1989. It contains translated and original Greek articles which, sometimes, do not exist in the 34-volume set. The articles of the Greek version are being gradually digitised now; the digitised volumes can be found on "vivlio2ebook" blog, which is dedicated on digitising various books in Greek language. It is written in Modern (Demotic) Greek, but uses the polytonic alphabet.

== Other Soviet encyclopedias ==
Soviet encyclopedias
Original title	Transliteration (if applicable)	English title	Volumes	Dates
Українська радянська енциклопедія	Ukrainśka radianśka entsyklopediia	Ukrainian Soviet Encyclopedia	17	1959–1965
Беларуская савецкая энцыклапедыя	Biełaruskaja savieckaja encykłapiedyja	Byelorussian Soviet Encyclopedia	12	1969–1975
Ўзбек совет энциклопедияси	Oʻzbek sovet entsiklopediyasi	Uzbek Soviet Encyclopedia	14	1971–1980
Қазақ совет энциклопедиясы	Qazaq sovet ensıklopedııasy	Kazakh Soviet Encyclopedia	10	1972–1978
ქართული საბჭოთა ენციკლოპედია	kartuli sabch'ota encik'lop'edia	Georgian Soviet Encyclopedia	12	1965–1987
Азәрбајҹан Совет Енсиклопедијасы	Azərbaycan Sovet Ensiklopediyası	Azerbaijani Soviet Encyclopedia	10	1976–1987
Lietuviškoji tarybinė enciklopedija	—	Lithuanian Soviet Encyclopedia	10	1976–1985
Енчиклопедия советикэ молдовеняскэ	Enciclopedia sovietică moldovenească	Moldavian Soviet Encyclopedia	8	1970–1981
Latvijas padomju enciklopēdija	—	Latvian Soviet Encyclopedia	10	1981–1988
Кыргыз Совет Энциклопедиясы	Kyrgyz Sovet Ensiklopediyasy	Kyrgyz Soviet Encyclopedia	6	1976–1980
Энциклопедияи советии тоҷик	Entsiklopediya-i sovieti-i tojik	Tajik Soviet Encyclopedia	8	1978–1988
Հայկական սովետական հանրագիտարան	Haykakan sovetakan hanragitaran	Armenian Soviet Encyclopedia	13	1974–1987
Түркмен совет энциклопедиясы	Türkmen sowet ensiklopediýasy	Turkmen Soviet Encyclopedia	10	1974–1989
Eesti nõukogude entsüklopeedia	—	Estonian Soviet Encyclopedia	8	1968–1976
Сибирская советская энциклопедия	Sibirskaya sovetskaya entsiklopediya	Siberian Soviet Encyclopedia	4 (planned — 6)	1929—1933
Малая Советская Энциклопедия	Malaya sovetskaya entsiklopediya	Small Soviet Encyclopedia	11	1928—1960 (3 editions)
Уральская советская энциклопедия	Uralskaya sovetskaya entsiklopediya	Ural Soviet Encyclopedia	1 (planned — ?)	1933

== Content ==
The Soviet Encyclopedia is a systematic summary of knowledge in social and economic studies with an emphasis on applied sciences. It became a universal reference work for the Soviet intelligentsia. According to the publisher's foreword in the English-language translation of the encyclopedia, the encyclopedia is important for knowledge and understanding of the USSR. A major value of the Encyclopedia is its comprehensive information about the Soviet Union and its peoples. Every aspect of Soviet life is systematically presented, including history, economics, science, art, and culture. The ethnic diversity of USSR's peoples and its languages and cultures are extensively covered. There are biographies of prominent cultural and scientific figures who are not as well known outside of Russia. There are detailed surveys of USSR's provinces and towns, as well as their geology, geography, flora and fauna.

The encyclopedia's Chief Editorial Board and advisory board sought input from the general public. The entry list was sent to universities, scientific institutions, museums, and private specialists in every field. More than 50,000 suggestions were received and many additions were made. Scholars believe that the Encyclopedia is a valuable and useful source for Russian history. The Encyclopedia, though noted as having a strong Marxist bias, provides useful information for understanding the Soviet point of view.

=== Damnatio memoriae ===
Following the arrest and execution of Lavrentiy Beria, the head of the NKVD, in 1953 the Encyclopedia—ostensibly in response to overwhelming public demand—mailed subscribers to the second edition a letter from the editor instructing them to cut out and destroy the three-page article on Beria and paste in its place enclosed replacement pages expanding the adjacent articles on F. W. Bergholz (an 18th-century courtier), the Bering Sea, and Bishop Berkeley. By April 1954, the Library of the University of California, Berkeley had received this “replacement.”

This was not the only case of political influence. According to one author, Encyclopedia subscribers received missives to replace articles in the fashion of the Beria article frequently. Other articles, especially biographical articles on political leaders, changed significantly to reflect the current party line. An article affected in such a fashion was the one on Nikolai Bukharin, whose descriptions went through several revisions.

== Great Russian Encyclopedia ==
Publication of the Great Soviet Encyclopedia was suspended in 1990 and halted in 1991, but in 2002 it was reinstituted by decree of Vladimir Putin. In 2003 and 2004 a team of editors overhauled the old encyclopedia by updating facts, removing most examples of overt political bias, and changing its name to the Great Russian Encyclopedia. Many outdated articles were entirely rewritten. In 2004 the first volume of the newly overhauled Great Russian Encyclopedia was published. The complete edition of 36 volumes was released by 2017.

Publication of the Great Russian Encyclopedia is overseen by the Russian Academy of Sciences, and funded by the Government of the Russian Federation. The encyclopedia is now found in libraries and schools throughout the CIS. Additionally, the 1980s editions remain in widespread use, particularly as references in scientific and mathematical research.

== See also ==
- Damnatio memoriae
- Encyclopædia Britannica
- Censorship in the Soviet Union
