= Boris Vvedensky =

Soviet radiophysicist

Boris Alekseyevich Vvedensky (Russian: Борис Алексеевич Введенский; 19 April 1893 – 1 June 1969) was a Soviet radiophysicist, academic and university professor.

== Life and career ==
Boris Vvedensky was born in Moscow in the family of a professor at the Moscow Theological Academy. In 1911 he graduated from a high school in Moscow, and in 1915 from the Faculty of Physics and Mathematics of the University of Moscow, from 1912 he worked in the laboratory of Vladimir Arkadiev, and in 1913 he became a laboratory assistant at the physics laboratory of Moscow University, and in 1915 a laboratory employee at the factory of military field telephones in Moscow. In 1916 he published his first scientific work.

From June 1916 to August 1917 he served in the Russian army, then returned to work at the telephone factory. In 1919 he became an employee of the laboratory of the Main Military-Engineering Directorate of the Red Army and a lecturer at the Faculty of Physics and Mathematics of Moscow State University. From 1923 to 1927 he was a senior researcher at the department magnetic State Experimental Electrotechnical Institute, then he became a senior researcher at the All-Union Electrotechnical Institute, where he later also served as head of the department and scientific director of the laboratory. From 1935 to 1940 he headed the laboratory of the Scientific and Research Institute in Leningrad (later he was a consultant at this institute) and was the scientific head of the laboratory of the Scientific and Research Institute of Physics at Moscow State University. In 1944 Vvedensky became the head of the laboratory and scientific director of the Scientific and Research Institute and from 1954 to the end of his life he headed the department of the Institute of Radio Engineering and Electronics of the Academy of Sciences of the Soviet Union. In 1934 he became a corresponding member and in 1943 an academician of the USSR Academy of Sciences, in 1929 he received the title of professor and in 1934 doctor of physical and mathematical sciences, and from 1946 to 1953 he was a member of the Presidium of the USSR Academy of Sciences. In 1945 he became deputy chairman, and in 1947 chairman (until 1951) of the All-Union Scientific Council on Radiophysics and Radio Engineering of the USSR Academy of Sciences.

From 1949 to 1951 Vvedensky was a member of the main editorial board and then main editor of the second edition and then the head of preparatory work for the third edition of the "Great Soviet Encyclopedia" (1951–1959). From 1959 to 1969 he chaired the Scientific Council of the Sovetskaya Encyklopedija Publishing House. From 1959 to 1969 he was the editor-in-chief of the third edition of the "Small Soviet Encyclopedia", as well as the physical encyclopedia dictionary. In 1955 he became a foreign member of the Academy of Sciences of the GDR.

He was buried at the Novodevichy Cemetery.

== Scientific work ==
Vvedensky's first works dealt with various issues in the field of magnetism and the theory of eddy currents . In 1925, he invented a method for calculating eddy currents in a ferromagnet with "magnetic viscosity". Along with Grigory Landsberg, he is the author of the fundamental work "Modern Doctrine of Magnetism." From 1927 to 1934 he took part in the compilation of the "Technical Encyclopedia" in 26 volumes, edited by Ludwig Martens, author of articles on the subject of "radiophysics".

Another area of his activity was issues related to the generation and reception of radio waves, in particular VHF. In 1926 he published the book "Physical Phenomena in Electron Tubes," dedicated to these problems. Subsequent work was devoted to the development of the theory of diffraction of ultrashort radio waves.

In 1933, he noted the influence of layered inhomogeneity of the troposphere on the propagation of ultrashort waves. Subsequently, in two reviews (1941, 1943), he gave a scientific substantiation of the data available in the world literature on the influence of the troposphere on the propagation of ultrashort waves. From 1944, he carried out a number of studies related to elucidating the influence of the troposphere on the propagation of ultrashort waves and the formation of a new field of knowledge, radio meteorology.
