= Nikolay Kun =

Russian historian, writer, and educator

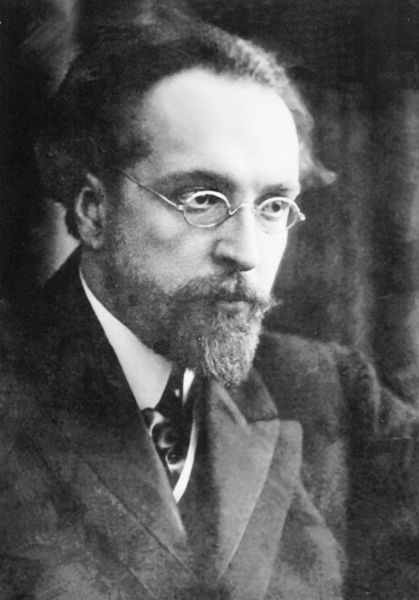
- Born: 21 May 1877; Russian Empire
- Died: 28 October 1940; Soviet Union
- Education: Moscow University
- Occupations: Writer, educator, historian
- Writing career
- Notable works: Greek Myths and Legends

Nikolay Albertovich Kun (Russian: Никола́й Альбе́ртович Кун, 21 May 1877 – 28 October 1940) was a Russian historian, writer, and educator. He is best known for his book Greek Myths and Legends (Legendy i Mify Drevnei Gretsii), which was extremely popular with readers in the Soviet Union. First published in 1914, it has been republished many times since and translated into a number of European languages.

== Biography ==
After graduating from Moscow University in 1903, he worked in a women's seminary in Tver, went to Germany in 1905 where he worked for one year in the Berlin University, then came back to Tver to give lectures on the history of culture in the Tver People's University. Since 1908 he taught history in Moscow high schools and lectured in several Moscow universities. He spent 1911 and 1912 in Rome making excursions to museums for Russian teachers and giving lectures on the arts of ancient Greece and Rome. In 1915 he was appointed professor of history at the Moscow City People's University, and professor of social science at the Moscow University in 1920. Since 1933 he was one of the editors of the Great Soviet Encyclopedia and the Small Soviet Encyclopedia.

He died in 1940.

== Sources ==
Nikolay Kun (in Russian).
