= Nikolai Meshcheryakov =

Russian publisher and writer (1865–1942)

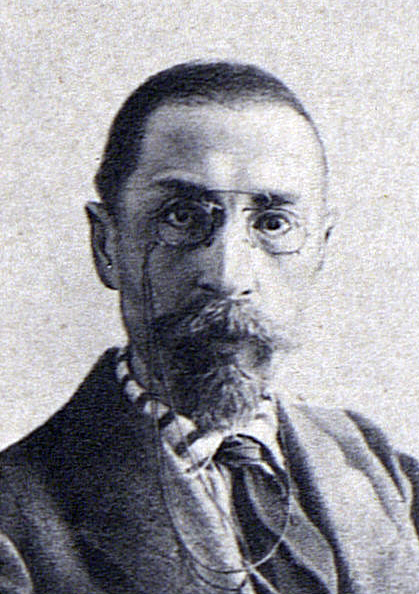

Nikolai Leonidovich Meshcheryakov (Russian: Николай Леонидович Мещеряков; 9 March [O. S. 25 February] 1865 – 3 April 1942) was a Russian revolutionary, Soviet historian of literature, newspaper editor and head of the Main Administration for Literary and Publishing Affairs (Glavlit) under the People's Commissariat for Education of Russian SFSR in the 1920s.

Meshcheryakov was born in Ryazan Governorate. His political career started off in Narodnya Volya where he learnt conspiratorial techniques, before turning to Marxism and becoming a member of the Russian Social Democratic Labour Party and later becoming aligned with its Bolshevik wing. He was an old Sunday school friend of Nadezhda Krupskaya and introduced her to social democracy and passed on his knowledge of illegal work. He spent some time in exile in Liège, Belgium.

He was the editor of Izvestia of the Moscow Military Revolutionary Committee and member of the editorial board of Izvestia of the Moscow Provincial Soviet during the October Revolution. From 1918 he was a member of the editorial board of Pravda. He was also a professor at the Faculty of Social Sciences of the Moscow State University.

In 1924 he joined Otto Schmidt in the group drawing up the outline of the Great Soviet Encyclopedia. Meshcheryakov was the chief editor of the first two editions of the Small Soviet Encyclopedia.

Meshcheryakov was a member of the Presidium of the Krestintern and served as the chief editor of the organization's magazine, The Peasant International.

He died in Kazan in 1942.

Zaraysk secondary school No. 1, as well as one street in Moscow, in the Tushino district, was named after Meshcheryakov.
