= Piatrus Brouka Belarusian Encyclopedia =

State publishing house in Minsk, Belarus (1967–2021)

- Native name: Беларуская Энцыклапедыя імя Петруся Броўкі
- Company type: State-owned enterprise
- Founded: January 1, 1967
- Defunct: October 31, 2021
- Fate: Merged into Belarus Publishing House
- Successor: Belarus Publishing House
- Headquarters: Minsk, Belarus
- Key people: Piatrus Brouka (founder)
- Products: Encyclopedias, dictionaries, reference books
- Parent: Ministry of Information of the Republic of Belarus

The Piatrus Brouka Belarusian Encyclopedia (Belarusian: Беларуская Энцыклапедыя імя Петруся Броўкі) was a state-owned publishing house within the system of the Ministry of Information of the Republic of Belarus. It existed from 1 January 1967 to 31 October 2021.

== History ==
It was founded in Minsk on 1 January 1967 as the Main Editorial Office of the Byelorussian Soviet Encyclopedia under the Academy of Sciences of the BSSR with the status of a research institute. From 1 January 1975, it was part of the State Committee for Publishing of the BSSR. In 1980, it was reorganized into a publishing house and named after Piatrus Brouka — the initiator of its creation and its first editor-in-chief.

In 2010, the creative team of the republican unitary enterprise "Piatrus Brouka Belarusian Encyclopedia Publishing House" was awarded the Diploma of the Laureate of the President of the Republic of Belarus Award "For Spiritual Revival" for the creation of the books "Land of Power. Belovezhskaya Pushcha" and "Radziwiłłs. Album of Portraits of the 18th–19th Centuries".

From 1 November 2021, by the decision of the founder (Ministry of Information of the Republic of Belarus), the republican unitary enterprise "Piatrus Brouka Belarusian Encyclopedia Publishing House" was merged with the republican unitary enterprise "Belarus Publishing House", which became its full legal successor.

== Activities ==
The publishing house combined publishing activities with research work. It specialized in the preparation and publication of universal, regional, and sectoral encyclopedias, encyclopedic reference books, dictionaries, explanatory, translation, and other dictionaries of the Belarusian language.

== Leadership ==
=== Editors-in-Chief ===
- Piatrus Brouka (1967–1980)
- Ivan Shamyakin (1980–1992)
- Mikhas Tkachou (April–October 1992)
- Barys Sachanka (1993–1995)
- Henadź Paškoŭ (1996–2008)
- Uladzimir Salamakha (2008–2010)
- Larysa Yazykovich (from 2010)

=== Directors ===
- Tatsiana Bialova (2008–2013)
- Uladzimir Aliaksandrau (2013–2014)
- Uladzimir Andryevich (2014–2019)
- Volha Vanina (2019–2021)

== Publications ==
It prepared and published the 12-volume "Byelorussian Soviet Encyclopedia" in 1969–1975 — a universal reference book on all branches of knowledge, the first multi-volume encyclopedia in the history of the Belarusian people (awarded the State Prize of the Byelorussian SSR in 1976).

Other major publications include:

- Explanatory Dictionary of the Belarusian Language (Vol. 1–5, 1977–1984)
- Byelorussian SSR. Short Encyclopedia (Vol. 1–5, 1978–1982, parallel in Belarusian and Russian)
- Encyclopedia of Nature of Belarus (Vol. 1–5, 1983–1986; Silver Medal of the United Nations Environment Programme in 1984)
- Encyclopedia of Literature and Art of Belarus (Vol. 1–5, 1984–1987)
- Collection of Monuments of History and Culture of Belarus (Vol. 1–7, 1984–1988; State Prize of the BSSR in 1990)
- Belarusian-Russian Dictionary (Vol. 1–2, 2nd ed. 1988–1989)
- Bio-bibliographical reference book Belarusian Writers (Vol. 1–6, 1992–1995)
- Encyclopedia of the History of Belarus (Vol. 1–6, 1993–2003)
- Illustrated Chronology of the History of Belarus (Part 1–2, 1995–1996)
- Russian-Belarusian Dictionary (Vol. 1–3, 6th ed. 1995)
- Belarusian Encyclopedia in 18 volumes (1996–2004)
- Theatrical Belarus in 2 volumes (2002–2003)
- Cities and Villages of Belarus in 10 volumes (2004–2021)
- Grand Duchy of Lithuania in 3 volumes (2005–2010)
- Republic of Belarus in 6 volumes (2005–2008)
- Sports Encyclopedia of Belarus (2005)
- Tourist Encyclopedia of Belarus (2007)
- Archaeology of Belarus in 2 volumes (2009)
- Culture of Belarus in 6 volumes (2010–2016)
- Radziwiłłs. Album of Portraits of the 18th–19th Centuries (2010)

Series published:

- Encyclopedic reference books about cities of Belarus (since 1976: Minsk, Brest, Vitebsk, Grodno, Mogilev, Gomel), about the flora and fauna of Belarus (since 1986), and encyclopedic reference books for children.
- Encyclopedic library "Belarus" (since 1978, 25 books published).
- Historical and documentary chronicles "Memory" (151 volumes about each district of Belarus, 1985–2015).
- Trilingual dictionaries, etc.

=== Encyclopedic reference books ===
Single-volume reference books include:

- Byelorussian Soviet Socialist Republic (1978)
- Academy of Sciences of the Byelorussian SSR (1978; in Russian, 1979)
- Workers' Professions (1980)
- Periodical Press of Belarus (1981)
- Forever in the People's Heart (3rd ed. 1984)
- Land Reclamation (1984)
- Yanka Kupala (1986)
- 2000 Professions... (1986)
- Union catalog The Book of Belarus, 1517–1917 (1986)
- Named After Them... (1987)
- Francysk Skaryna and His Time (1988; in Russian, 1990)
- Potato (1988 and 1994)
- Ethnography of Belarus (1989)
- Statute of the Grand Duchy of Lithuania 1588: Texts. Reference. Comments (1989)
- Nature of Belarus (2nd ed., 1989)
- Belarus in the Great Patriotic War, 1941–1945 (1990)
- Health (1990)
- Photography (1992)
- Legal Encyclopedic Dictionary (1992)
- Red Data Book of the Republic of Belarus (2nd ed. 1993)
- Architecture of Belarus (1993)
- Archaeology and Numismatics of Belarus (1993)
- Encyclopedia of a Young Family (8th ed., 1995)
- Thinkers and Educators of Belarus, 10th–19th Centuries (1995)
- Veterinary Encyclopedia (1995)
- Chernobyl (1996)
- Folk Culture of Belarus (2002)

=== Facsimile editions ===
- Dictionary of the Belarusian Language by Ivan Nasovich (1983)
- Bible of Francysk Skaryna (Vol. 1–3, 1990–1991)
- Picturesque Russia (1993, 2nd ed. 1994)
