= National Encyclopedia =

National Encyclopedia:

- National Encyclopedia of Azerbaijan
- Banglapedia of Bangladesh
- Latvian National Encyclopedia
- National Encyclopedia (USA) or Source Book
- National Encyclopedia of Uzbekistan
