= Pyatrowshchyna =

Former village and neighborhood in Minsk, Belarus

Coordinates: 54°52′00″N 27°29′40″E

Piatroŭščyna Пятроўшчына (Belarusian)
- Neighborhood
- Interactive map of Piatroŭščyna
- Country: Belarus
- City: Minsk
- First mentioned: 1492
- Merged into Minsk: 1978
- Formerly a village in the Minsk District

Piatroŭščyna (Пятро́ўшчына) is a former village and currently a neighborhood in the southwestern part of Minsk, Belarus. It is located on the banks of the Myška river (a tributary of the Lošyca in the Svislach basin), southwest of the Hrušaŭka neighborhood.

== History ==
=== Grand Duchy of Lithuania ===
The settlement likely emerged on lands separated from the ancient Lošyca volost. Between 1453 and 1492, Grand Duke Casimir IV Jagiellon confirmed the purchase of a "small estate" (imeneytsa) "on the river... on the Lošyca" by his scribe, Pietraszka Lubicz, from Piotr Dzierżkowicz, the brother of Bishop Mikołaj. In 1493, Grand Duke Alexander Jagiellon also confirmed Lubicz's purchases.

In 1492, Piatroŭski dvor is mentioned, belonging to the royal scribe Piotr Lubicz, and it was likely his main estate. The name of the manor evidently comes from the owner's first name, though it is uncertain whether it refers to Lubicz or Dzierżkowicz. Under Piotr Lubicz, the Piatroŭski Dvor estate included, among other things, a mill on the Pcič river and a large apiary land between the Barysaŭ and Lahojsk roads. Piotr Lubicz bequeathed half of the flour from the mill, the apiary, and a tithe "from all grain" from the lands in Verbkovichy and Piatroŭski Dvor to the Church of the Ascension of Christ in Minsk.

In 1567, it is mentioned as the village of Piatrovičy, belonging to P. Krantowski and U. Chmielewski, situated in the Minsk Povet of the Minsk Voivodeship of the Grand Duchy of Lithuania. In the 17th and 18th centuries, the Polonized name Pietrowszczyzna appears. In 1667, the estate Piatraŭščyzna had 7 hearths (dym) and was the property of the Catholic Church.

In 1791, one part of Piatroŭščyna contained the estate of Žyžemski, a tavern, 23 hearths, and belonged to the Karališčavičy Catholic parish.

=== Russian Empire ===
As a result of the Second Partition of Poland in 1793, the territory became part of the Russian Empire, within the Minsk Uyezd of the Minsk Governorate.

In 1800, the lord's manor and the village were the property of the noble I. Žyžemski. There were 15 households, 106 residents, a mill on the Piatroŭščyna river, a roadside tavern, and a brick factory employing 6 peasants.

From 1858, another part of Piatroŭščyna was owned by Napaleon Yazafatavich Čarnocki. He soon died childless, and the estate passed to his relative Kazimir Michatavich Čarnocki. This portion included 100 revision souls (male serfs) and over 952 desyatinas of land.

After 1861, the village was part of the Sienica volost of the Minsk Uyezd. In 1876, the folwark Piatroŭščyna, together with Niadzviežyna, was owned by the nobleman of Roman Catholic faith Kazimir Mikhaylovich Čarnocki (sometimes erroneously spelled Charnecki). In total, there were 414 desyatinas of land, and the farm was managed by a tenant. In 1888, he was still the owner, with 190 desyatinas of land.

According to the 1897 census, the village had a Catholic chapel (assigned to the Minsk Cathedral parish), a communal granary, a tavern, and a separate manor estate.

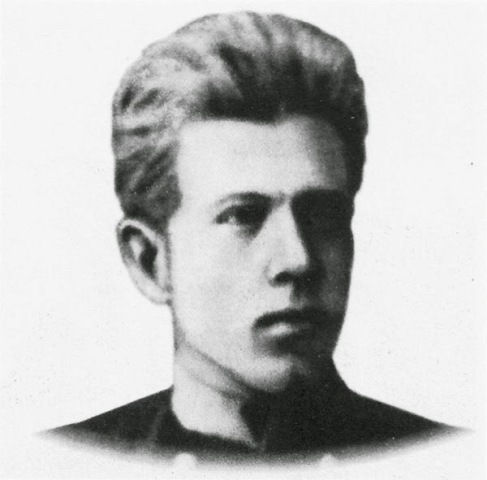
Napaleon Čarnocki. Presumed to be the last owner of the Piatroŭščyna estate

In 1906, a one-act play-vaudeville "A revision" by Ukrainian playwright Marko Kropyvnytsky was staged at the estate. It was likely performed in a Belarusian translation by Napaleon Čarnocki (the son of the owner, or possibly the owner himself at that time). An article by Yazep Dyla, citing Aliaksandr Burbis, described the event:

"The stage was a platform near the barn. Benches were made for the paying public and acquaintances of the folwark owners. There was an amateur orchestra — cymbals, violin, and tambourine. Farmhands from neighboring estates and folwarks, as well as peasants, had free entry to the performance. A lot of people gathered from the village, over three hundred persons. The elderly were seated in front so they could see and hear everything well."

After the performance, Ales Burbis read poems by Yanka Kupala: "Što ty spiš?" (Why do you sleep?), "Nie rvisia k bahatym" (Do not tear yourself towards the rich), and "Paškaduj mužyka!" (Pity the peasant!).

In 1913, the owner of the estate was Kazimir Čarnocki (most likely his son, Napaleon Čarnocki), possessing 331 desyatinas.

=== Recent history ===
From late February 1918, the territory was occupied by the troops of the German Empire. On 25 March 1918, according to the Third Constituent Charter, it was declared part of the Belarusian People's Republic. In December 1918, it was occupied by the Red Army. From 1 January 1919, in accordance with the resolution of the First Congress of the Communist Party of Belarus, it became part of the Socialist Soviet Republic of Byelorussia; from 27 February 1919, it was part of the LitBel SSR. During the Polish–Soviet War (August 1919 – July 1920 and October 1920), it was under Polish occupation (Minsk District of the Civil Administration of the Eastern Lands).

From 31 July 1920, it was part of the Byelorussian Soviet Socialist Republic. The estate was nationalized, and a collective farm was established. In 1924, it became part of the Padhajski rural council of the Samakhvalavichy District, Minsk Okrug. From 1931, it was under the administrative jurisdiction of the Minsk City Council, and from 26 May 1935, in the Minsk District.

During World War II, from late June 1941 to early July 1944, it was under the occupation of Nazi Germany.

On 20 January 1960, the village was transferred from the abolished Miadzviežynski rural council to the Ščomyslicki rural council. In 1978, it was incorporated into the city of Minsk.

The village street Pryluckaja was renamed to Piatroŭščyna Street, and Vadapravodnaja Street became Piatroŭščyna Lane. Mass demolition of the village began in the second half of the 2000s, when apartment blocks were built in the quarter of Dziaržynskaha Avenue, Haziety Praŭda Avenue, and Alibiehava Street. Part of the village housing remains along Piatroŭščyna Street.

== Population ==
- 1800: 15 households, 106 residents.
- 1897: Village — 43 households, 272 residents; Estate — 2 households, 17 residents.
- 1908: Village — 40 households, 241 residents; Estate — 1 household, 16 residents; Tract (tavern) — 1 household, 10 residents; Tract (smithy) — 1 household, 7 residents.
- 1917: Village — 44 households, 250 residents (all Belarusians); Estate — 1 household, 39 residents (19 Belarusians and 20 Poles); Tavern — 1 household, 7 residents (all Jews); Smithy — 1 household, 7 residents (all Jews).

== Modernity ==
The name of the village is preserved in the names of Piatroŭščyna Street and Piatroŭščyna Lane. The Piatroŭščyna metro station is named after the village. The village cemetery has been preserved.

== Lost heritage ==
- Čarnocki Manor. Boarding school No. 7 was built on the site of the Čarnocki manor in the 1960s.

== Interesting facts ==
- The Čarnocki estate was occasionally visited by the wife of the famous Lithuanian artist Mikalojus Konstantinas Čiurlionis, Sofija Kymantaitė-Čiurlionienė. She gave birth to their daughter, Danutė Čiurlionytė-Zubovienė, in Piatroŭščyna.

== Sources ==
- Пашкоў, Г. П., ed. (1998). Памяць: Гіст-дакум. хроніка Мінскага р-на [Memory: Hist.-docum. chronicle of the Minsk district] (in Belarusian). Мінск: БелЭН. p. 640. ISBN 985-11-0125-7.
- Шамякин, И. П.; et al., eds. (1983). "Петровщина". Минск : энциклопедический справочник [Minsk: Encyclopedic Reference] (in Russian). Минск: Белорусская Советская Энциклопедия. p. 467.
- Груша, А. І. (2012). "Ваколіцы Менска і іх уладальнікі ў 30-х гадах XV — пачатку XVI ст." [Outskirts of Minsk and their owners in the 1430s – early 16th century]. Мінск і мінчане: дзесяць стагоддзяў гісторыі. Крыніцы па гісторыі горада. Сацыяльныя структуры і паўсядзённасць (да 945-годдзя Мінска) [Minsk and Minskers: ten centuries of history...] (in Belarusian). Мінск: Беларуская навука. pp. 50–89. ISBN 978-985-08-1497-5.
- Рапановіч, Я. Н. (1981). Шуба, П. П. (ed.). Слоўнік назваў населеных пунктаў Мінскай вобласці [Dictionary of Settlement Names of the Minsk Region] (in Belarusian). Мінск: Навука і тэхніка. p. 360.
- Сацукевіч, І. І. "Вёскі, што ўвайшлі ў склад Мінска" [Villages that became part of Minsk]. nashapamiac.org (in Belarusian). Archived from the original on 2018-10-09.
- Ярмоловичъ В. С. (1909). Списокъ населенныхъ мѣстъ Минской губерніи [List of populated places of the Minsk Governorate] (in Russian). Минскъ: Изданіе Минскаго Губернскаго Статистическаго Комитета. p. 231.
- Списокъ Землевладѣльцевъ Минской Губерніи за 1876 годъ [List of Landowners of the Minsk Governorate for 1876] (in Russian). Минскъ: Типографія Губернскаго Правленія. 1877. p. 187.
- Списокъ Землевладѣльцевъ Минской Губерніи [за 1888 год] [List of Landowners of the Minsk Governorate [for 1888]] (PDF) (in Russian). Минскъ: Минская Губернская Типографія. 1889. p. 419.
- Список населенных мест Б.С.С.Р. (б. Минской губернии) [List of populated places of the B.S.S.R. (f. Minsk Governorate)] (in Russian). Минск: Белтрестпечать. 1924. p. 159.
- "Piotrowszczyzna (12)". Słownik geograficzny Królestwa Polskiego i innych krajów słowiańskich [Geographical Dictionary of the Kingdom of Poland] (in Polish). Vol. 8. Warsaw: Wieku. 1887. p. 220.
- W. Dworzaczek, ed. (1914). Nad Świsłoczą: kalendarz miński informacyjny na rok 1914 (in Polish). Wilno: Znicz. p. 130.
