= Moldavian Soviet Encyclopedia =

Defunct encyclopedia of Soviet Moldova, issued in the USSR

- Language: Romanian (in the Moldovan Cyrillic alphabet) and Russian
- Subject: General
- Genre: Reference encyclopaedia
- Publication place: USSR (Moldavian SSR)

The Moldavian Soviet Encyclopedia (Romanian: Enciclopedia Sovietică Moldovenească, Moldovan Cyrillic: Енчиклопедия Советикэ Молдовеняскэ) was a multi purpose encyclopedia of the Moldavian SSR, issued in the USSR. Moldavian Soviet Encyclopedia was printed in 8 volumes in Chișinău from 1970 to 1981. An additional volume, Moldavian SSR, was published in both Romanian and Russian in 1979.

== See also ==
- Great Soviet Encyclopedia
