= Kyrgyz Soviet Encyclopedia =

Kyrgyz language encyclopedia

- Language: Kyrgyz and Russian
- Subject: General
- Genre: Reference encyclopaedia
- Publication place: Kyrgyz SSR, USSR
- OCLC: 12585956

The Kyrgyz Soviet Encyclopedia (Kyrgyz: Кыргыз Совет Энциклопедиясы) is the first Kyrgyz language general encyclopedia. Its six volumes were published in the capital city of Frunze (since renamed Bishkek) from 1976 to 1980. A supplemental volume, Kyrgyz SSR, was published in 1982 in both Kyrgyz and Russian.

== Main editors ==
Asanbek Tabaldiev (v. 1), Byubiyna Oruzbayeva (v. 2–6).

== See also ==
- Great Soviet Encyclopedia
