= Kazakh Soviet Encyclopedia =

Encyclopedias with 12 volumes (+ 1 extra volume) in Kazakh language from 1972 to 1980

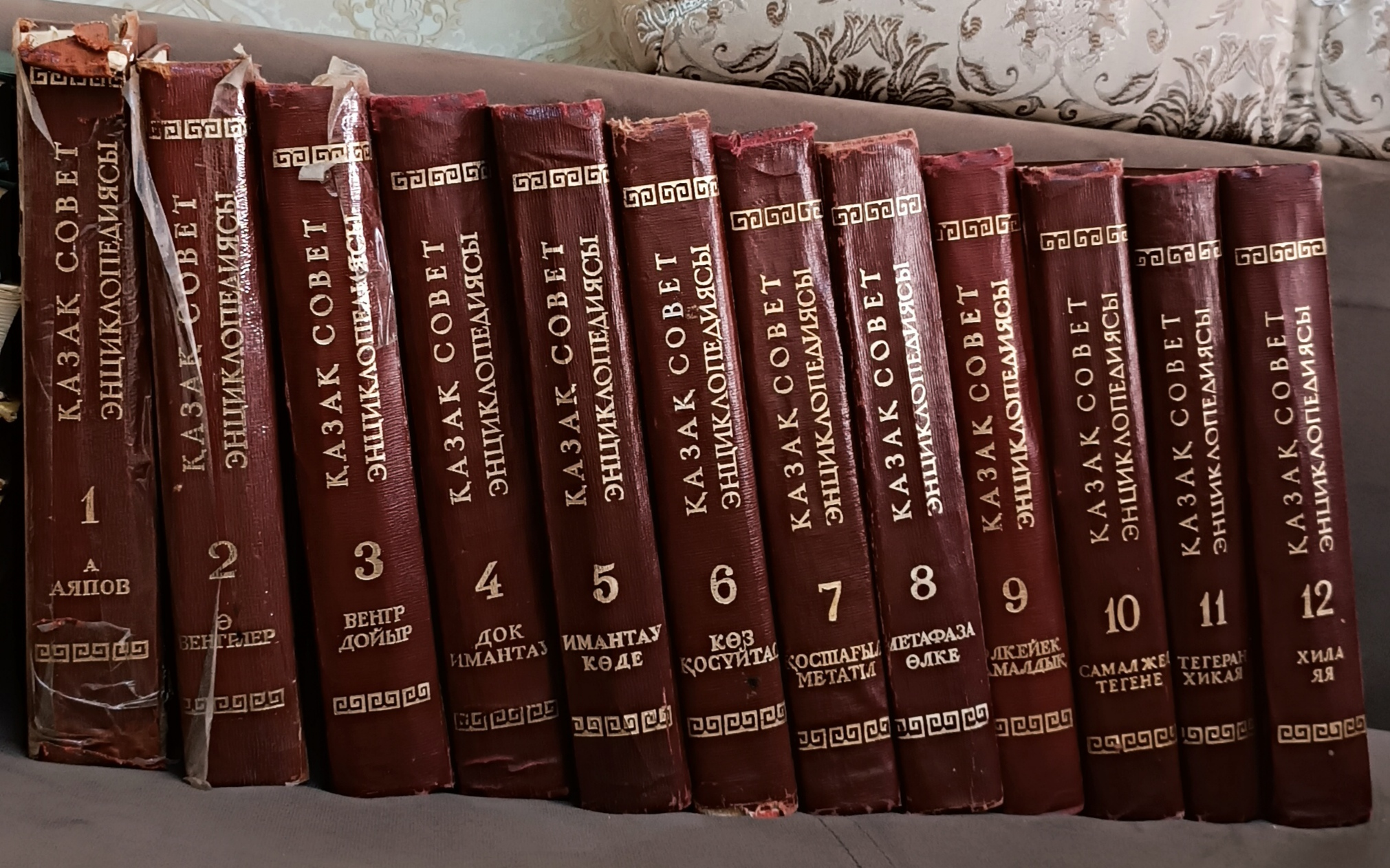
- Language: Kazakh and Russian
- Subject: General
- Genre: Reference encyclopaedia
- Publisher: Main Redaction of Kazakh Soviet Encyclopedia
- Publication date: 1972–1978 (extra volume in 1980)
- Publication place: Kazakh SSR, USSR

The Kazakh Soviet Encyclopedia (Kazakh: Қазақ Совет энциклопедиясы, Qazaq Sovet Entsıklopedııasy) was a multi-purpose encyclopedia of Kazakhstan issued in the Soviet Union. It was founded by Mukhamedzhan Karataev, the executive secretary of Kazakhstan. Kazakh Soviet Encyclopedia was printed in 12 volumes + 1 volume in Almaty from 1972 to 1978 (the thirteenth, extra, volume was published in 1980). An additional four-volume, Kazakh SSR, was published in both Kazakh and Russian from 1985 to 1989.

Each volume had 40,000 copies. The number of pages of each volume is listed below:

- First – 648
- Second – 640
- Third – 624
- Fourth – 672
- Fifth – 656
- Sixth – 640
- Seventh – 648
- Eighth – 664
- Ninth – 640
- Tenth – 648
- Eleventh – 632
- Twelfth – 600
- Thirteenth (extra volume) – 752

== See also ==
- Great Soviet Encyclopedia
