= Piatrus Brouka =

Soviet Belarusian poet (1905–1980)

- Пятрусь Броўка
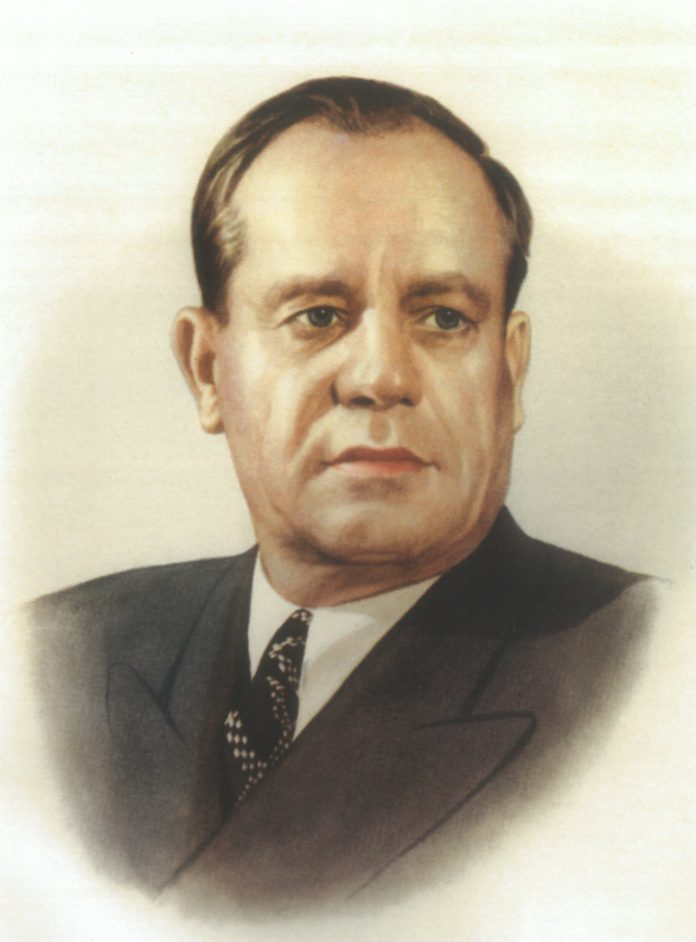
- Born: Piotr Ustsinavich Brouka; 25 June 1905; Pucilkavičy, Russian Empire (now Belarus)
- Died: 24 March 1980 (aged 74); Minsk, Byelorussian SSR, Soviet Union (now Belarus)
- Education: Belarusian State University

Piotr Ustsinavich Brouka (Belarusian: Пётр Усці́навіч Бро́ўка, romanized: Piotr Ustsinavich Brouka; 25 June 1905 [O.S. 12 June] − 24 March 1980) was a Soviet Belarusian poet, better known by his literary pseudonym Piatrus Brouka (Belarusian: Пятрусь Броўка, romanized: Piatruś Broŭka).

== Biography ==
Brouka was born into a large but poor peasant family in Pucilkavičy, a settlement in present-day Ushachy Raion, Vitebsk Region, on 25 June 1905. His first published works were printed in 1926, and the young poet briefly served as executive secretary of a local newspaper in 1927. In 1928 he enrolled in the Literature-Linguistics Department of Belarusian State University, graduating in 1931. Brouka joined the Communist Party of the Soviet Union in 1940.

During the Great Patriotic War, like most of the European Soviet Union, the Soviet Byelorussian SSR was invaded and occupied by Nazi Germany in the summer of 1941. Brouka voluntarily joined the Soviet Red Army but refused to participate in hostile actions. Brouka's mother was arrested and detained by the Germans, and spend time in various prisons. Ultimately, Brouka's mother was deported to the Auschwitz extermination camp in German-occupied Poland and later murdered there. Brouka himself wrote for the partisan press and published in the army newspapers, lauding the fighting effort of the Soviet people. He was recognized by the Soviet government with the Stalin Prize in 1947, the same year that Brouka was elected chairman of the Writers' Union of the Byelorussian SSR (a position that he would hold until 1967).

Brouka reputation as a Soviet and Belarusian poet continued to grow during Brouka's subsequent decades in Minsk after the war. The fullest apex of his literary talents is considered to be his final decades in the 1960s and 1970s.

Brouka was awarded the prestigious Lenin Prize after his completion of the poetry volume And Time Goes On in 1962. In 1966, Brouka edited the first volume of the Byelorussian Soviet Encyclopedia, the year he was given the title of People's Poet of the Byelorussian Soviet Socialist Republic. He was elected a full member of the Belarusian Academy of Sciences in 1966.

Apart from literary work, he served several terms as a representative of the Supreme Soviet of the Soviet Union, but maintained his literary career even as a political delegate. Some of his later verses made their way into Soviet pop music when they were adapted by the Belarusian Soviet folk rock band Pesniary.

Brouka was awarded the title Hero of Socialist Labor in 1972.

Minsk's Literary Museum of Petrus Brouka was established in his honor in 1980, when Brouka died at age 74.

In 2005, Belarus issued a postage stamp celebrating the hundredth anniversary of Pyotr Brouka's birth.

== Honours and awards ==
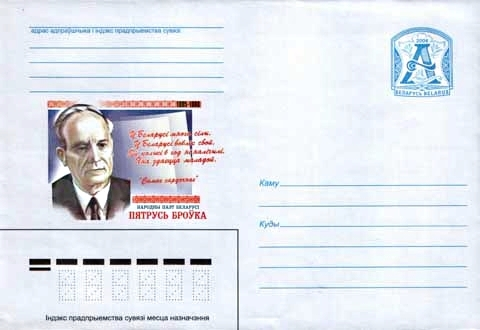
Covers of Belarus 2006 Piatruś Broǔka

- Hero of Socialist Labour (1972)
- Order of Lenin (1949, 1965, 1972)
- Order of the October Revolution (1971)
- Order of the Red Star (1943)
- Order of Friendship of Peoples (1975)
- Order of the Badge of Honour (1939)
- Lenin Prize (1962) - a collection of poems "And the days go by ..." (1961)
- Stalin Prizes;
  - 2nd class (1947) - for the poem "Bread" and "Thoughts about Moscow", the poem "The People's thanks", "Brother and Sister", "If I be", "Meeting"
  - 3rd class (1951) - a collection of poems "The Road of Life"
- BSSR State Prizes;
  - 1970 - a collection of poems, "Among the red mountain ashes"
  - 1976 - for participation in the creation of the Belarusian Soviet Encyclopedia
- Yakub Kolas Literary prize (1957) - for the novel "When the merge of the river" (1957)
- People's Poet of the Byelorussian SSR (1966)
