= Collection of Monuments of History and Culture of Belarus =

Multi-volume encyclopedia of monuments in Belarus

- Original title: Збор помнікаў гісторыі і культуры Беларусі
- Language: Belarusian, Russian (one volume)
- Genre: Encyclopedia, Reference work
- Publisher: Byelorussian Soviet Encyclopedia
- Publication date: 1984–1988
- Publication place: Byelorussian Soviet Socialist Republic

The Collection of Monuments of History and Culture of Belarus (Belarusian: Збор по́мнікаў гісто́рыі і культу́ры Белару́сі) is a multi-volume reference work published in Minsk between 1984 and 1988. It was awarded the State Prize of the Byelorussian SSR in 1990.

Published in the Belarusian language in 7 volumes (8 books), it was part of the All-Union multi-volume edition "Collection of Monuments of History and Culture of the Peoples of the USSR". It was prepared by the Sector of the Collection of Monuments of History and Culture of Belarus of the Institute of Art Studies, Ethnography and Folklore of the Academy of Sciences of the BSSR, the Department of Archaeology of the Institute of History of the Academy of Sciences of the BSSR, and the publishing house "Byelorussian Soviet Encyclopedia" named after Piatrus Brouka. In 1990, an expanded and revised volume of the "Collection..." for the Brest Region was published in Russian.

It includes articles (more than 14,000) about immovable monuments (historical, archaeological, architectural, monumental, and monumental-decorative art) that have survived from ancient times to the mid-19th century, those most characteristic of the second half of the 19th – early 20th century, the pre-war Soviet period (1917–1941), the best architectural structures of the post-war period (1950s–1980s), and those that are or should be under state protection.

Each volume is dedicated to a specific region (voblasts). The volume dedicated to the Minsk Region is in two books, and a separate volume is devoted to the monuments of the city of Minsk. Materials in the volumes are arranged by districts (in alphabetical order of their names); each volume has name, geographical, and chronological indexes. The regional center is highlighted as an independent territorial unit, with information about it placed at the beginning of the volume. Within a district, materials about the administrative center are placed first, followed by monuments of other settlements (in alphabetical order). Articles about monuments within a single settlement are presented in alphabetical order of their names. In total, the publication contains 457.6 accounting-publishing sheets, 131 maps, and 6,817 illustrations, 1,420 of which are in color.

== Volumes ==
- Збор помнікаў гісторыі і культуры Беларусі. Брэсцкая вобласць /АН БССР, Ін-т мастацтвазнаўства, этнаграфіі і фальклору; Рэд. кал.: С. В. Марцэлеў (гал. рэд.) і інш.— Мн.: Беларус. Сав. Энцыклапедыя, 1984.— 368 см іл.
- Збор помнікаў гісторыі і культуры Беларусі. Віцебская вобласць /АН БССР, Ін-т мастацтвазнаўства, этнаграфіі і фальклору; Рэд. кал.: С. В. Марцэлеў (гал. рэд.) і інш.— Мн.: Беларус. Сав. Энцыклапедыя, 1985,— 496 с., іл.
- Збор помнікаў гісторыі і культуры Беларусі. Гомельская вобласць /АН БССР, Ін-т мастацтвазнаўства, этнаграфіі і фальклору; Рэд. кал.: С. В. Марцэлеў (гал. рэд.) і інш.— Мн.: Беларус. Сав. Энцыклапедыя, 1985.—383 с., іл.
- Збор помнікаў гісторыі і культуры Беларусі. Гродзенская вобласць /АН БССР, Ін-т мастацтвазнаўства, этнаграфіі і фальклору; Рэд. кал.: С. В. Марцэлеў (гал. рэд.) і інш.— Мн.: БелСЭ, 1986.- 371 с., іл.
- Збор помнікаў гісторыі і культуры Беларусі. Магілёўская вобласць /АН БССР, Ін-т мастацтвазнаўства, этнаграфіі і фальклору; Рэд. кал.: С. 13. Марцэлеў (гал. рэд.) і інш.— Мн.: Беларус. Сав. Энцыклапедыя, 1986.— 408 с., іл.
- Збор помнікаў гісторыі і культуры Беларусі. Мінск /АН БССР. Ін-т мастацтвазнаўства, этнаграфіі і фальклору; Рэдкал.: С. В. Марцэлеў (гал. рэд.) і інш.— Мн.: БелСЭ, 1988.— 333 с.: іл. ISBN 5-85700-006-8.
- Збор помнікаў гісторыі і культуры Беларусі. Мінская вобласць /АН БССР. Ін-т мастацтвазнаўства, этнаграфіі і фальклору; Рэдкал.: С. В. Марцэлеў (гал. рэд.) і інш.— Мн.: БелСЭ, 1987,- 284 с.: іл.
- Збор помнікаў гісторыі і культуры Беларусі. Мінская вобласць /АН БССР. Ін-т мастацтвазнаўства, зтнаграфіі і фальклору; Рэдкал.: С. В. Марцэлеў (гал. рэд.) і інш.— Мн.: БелСЭ, 1987,— 308 с.: іл.
- Свод памятников истории и культуры Белоруссии. Брестская область/АН БССР, Ин-т искусствоведения, этнографии и фольклора, Белорус. Сов. Энцикл.; Редкол.: С. В. Марцелев (гл. ред.) и др.— Мн.: БелСЭ, 1990.— 424 с.: ил. ISBN 5-85700-017-3. (In Russian).

== Literature ==
- Пашкоў, Г. П.; et al., eds. (1998). Беларуская энцыклапедыя: У 18 т. Т. 7: Застаўка — Кантата [Belarusian Encyclopedia: In 18 Vol. Vol. 7: Zastaŭka — Kantata] (in Belarusian). Мінск: БелЭн. ISBN 985-11-0035-8.
