= Latvian National Encyclopedia =

The National Encyclopedia
- Original title: Nacionālā enciklopēdija "Latvija"
- Language: Latvian
- Subject: General encyclopedia
- Genre: Encyclopedia
- Publisher: Nacionālās enciklopēdijas padome
- Publication date: 2018
- Publication place: Latvia
- Media type: Book and online encyclopedia
- Pages: 862
- ISBN: 9789984850610

The Latvian National Encyclopedia (Latvian: Nacionālā enciklopēdija) is a universal encyclopedia in Latvian, which was published in 2018 to mark the centenary of the independence of Latvia. The National Encyclopaedia Editorial Office works as an affiliate of the Administration Branch of the National Library of Latvia.

== Overview ==
=== Background ===
The first attempt at creating a national encyclopedia in independent Latvia was launched in the interwar period by the publishing house of Ansis Gulbis. The first edition of the Latvian Dictionary of Conversation was published in 1927, but after 21 volumes (the last one ending with the article about Giovanni Battista Tiepolo) the work was cut short by the Soviet occupation of Latvia in 1940. The first complete encyclopedia, with content suited to Soviet ideology, was issued during the Soviet occupation as the Latvian Soviet Encyclopedia from 1981 to 1988.

=== Modern edition ===
The National Encyclopedia project was launched in late 2014. Tilde, a Latvian IT company, was selected as the provider of the electronic platform of the encyclopedia on 18 December 2014. The editorial board of the encyclopedia began its work in July 2015.

The making of the encyclopedia is supervised by the Council of the National Encyclopedia led by the Latvian Minister of Culture (Dace Melbārde at the time of the launch). The Board of Editors consists of four editors and the Chief Editor, Dr. hist. Valters Ščerbinskis, whereas the Professional Editor Board (Latvian: Nozaru redakcijas kolēģija) is made up of 46 consultants, each assigned to a certain topic, and is led by National Library of Latvia director Andris Vilks. From 2014 to 2018, annual budget funding towards the creation of the encyclopedia was €200-250 thousand, which in total amounted to €1,1 million.

The 864-page thick, first paper edition of the encyclopedia was released in October 2018 with a price tag of €38.50. It is thematically focused on Latvian topics and is dedicated to the Centenary of the Republic of Latvia. Due to high demand, the 3000 copies of the issue were sold out in a few days and an additional batch of 1000 books had to be printed.

== Online version ==
Since December 2018, the encyclopedia is also available online. The online version does not have a thematical focus and covers a wide variety of subjects on world culture, science, economics etc. By February 2019, around 900 articles had been published. By May 2022, the number had reached over 3000, in December 2023 - 4190. By May 2026 it had grown to 5754.
