= Turkmen Soviet Encyclopedia =

Turkmen language encyclopedia

- Language: Turkmen and Russian
- Subject: General
- Genre: Reference encyclopaedia
- Publication place: Turkmen SSR, USSR
- OCLC: 11531969

The Turkmen Soviet Encyclopedia (Turkmen: Түркмен совет энциклопедиясы) was the first encyclopedia in the Turkmen language (Cyrillic alphabet), published in Ashkhabad in ten volumes from 1974 to 1989.

A supplementary volume, Turkmen SSR, was published in both Turkmen (1983) and Russian (1984).

Main editors: Pygam Azimov (v1), Nury Atamamedov (v2-10).
