= Latvian Soviet Encyclopedia =

Encyclopedia in Latvia

- Language: Latvian and Russian
- Subject: General
- Genre: Reference encyclopaedia
- Publisher: Galvenā enciklopēdiju redakcija
- Publication date: 1981–1988
- Publication place: Latvian SSR, USSR
- OCLC: 9349697

The Latvian Soviet Encyclopedia (Latvian: Latvijas padomju enciklopēdija) is a universal encyclopedia in Latvian in 10 volumes.

== History ==
The main part of the encyclopaedia was published in ten volumes from 1981 to 1988. The volume 5_{2}, Latvian SSR, was also published in Russian. A supplement was published in 1988.

The main editor was Pēteris Jērāns, and it was printed in Riga numbering 75,000 sets.

== Content ==
The encyclopedia contains around 60,000 articles, and includes around 20,000 illustrations and over 600 maps. It covers all branches of knowledge, with the expected ideological emphasis of publications originating in the Soviet bloc in the period.

== Volumes ==
Vol.	Content	Year
1	A — Bh	1981
2	Bi — Dža	1982
3	Dže — Hain	1983
4	Hait — Karta	1983
5_{1}	Karte — Lauk	1984
5_{2}	Latvijas PSR	1984
6	Lauk — Monr	1985
7	Mons — Plato	1986
8	Platp — Singa	1986
9	Singo — Trien	1987
10_{1}	Tries — Žvīgu	1987
10_{2}	supplement	1988

== See also ==
- Latvian National Encyclopedia
