= Byelorussian Soviet Encyclopedia =

- Language: Belarusian
- Subject: General
- Genre: Reference encyclopaedia
- Publication date: 1969-1975
- Publication place: Byelorussian SSR, USSR
- OCLC: 5710505

The Byelorussian Soviet Encyclopedia (Belarusian: Беларуская Савецкая Энцыклапедыя) is the first universal encyclopaedia in the Belarusian language in 12 volumes printed in Minsk from 1969 to 1975. The chief editorial board was established in 1967.

More than five thousand authors wrote for the encyclopedia, including 125 academics and members of the Academy of Sciences of the BSSR or of the Academy of Sciences of the USSR and its branches. More than 85% of authors lived and worked in the Byelorussian SSR.

The first eleven volumes contain encyclopedic articles; the twelfth was dedicated to the BSSR. The total number of articles in the encyclopedia numbered 34,409, of which about 40% devoted to Belarusian subjects. Around six thousand articles are about history, around ten thousand on the natural sciences, about 6.7 thousand on geography, around 6.8 thousand on culture, and around seven thousand biographies.

The twelve volumes contain 112 color inserts (1554 illustrations and 172 maps), 215 black and white inserts (3002 illustrations), and around 8 thousand illustrations and 500 maps included in the text.

== See also ==
- Great Soviet Encyclopedia
