= Small Soviet Encyclopedia =

General encyclopedia published in the Soviet Union

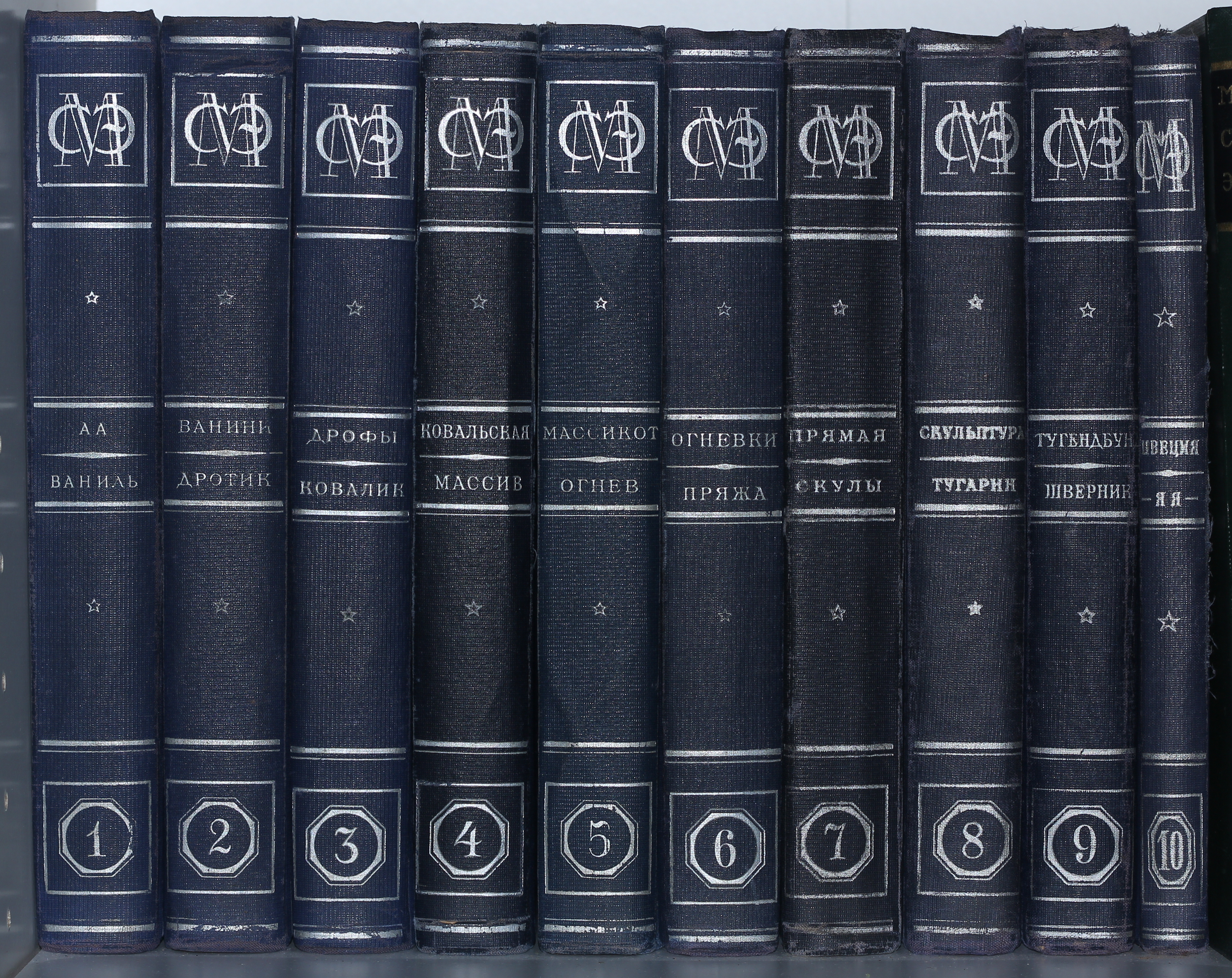
- Small Soviet Encyclopedia set (1928)
- Subject: General
- Genre: Reference encyclopaedia

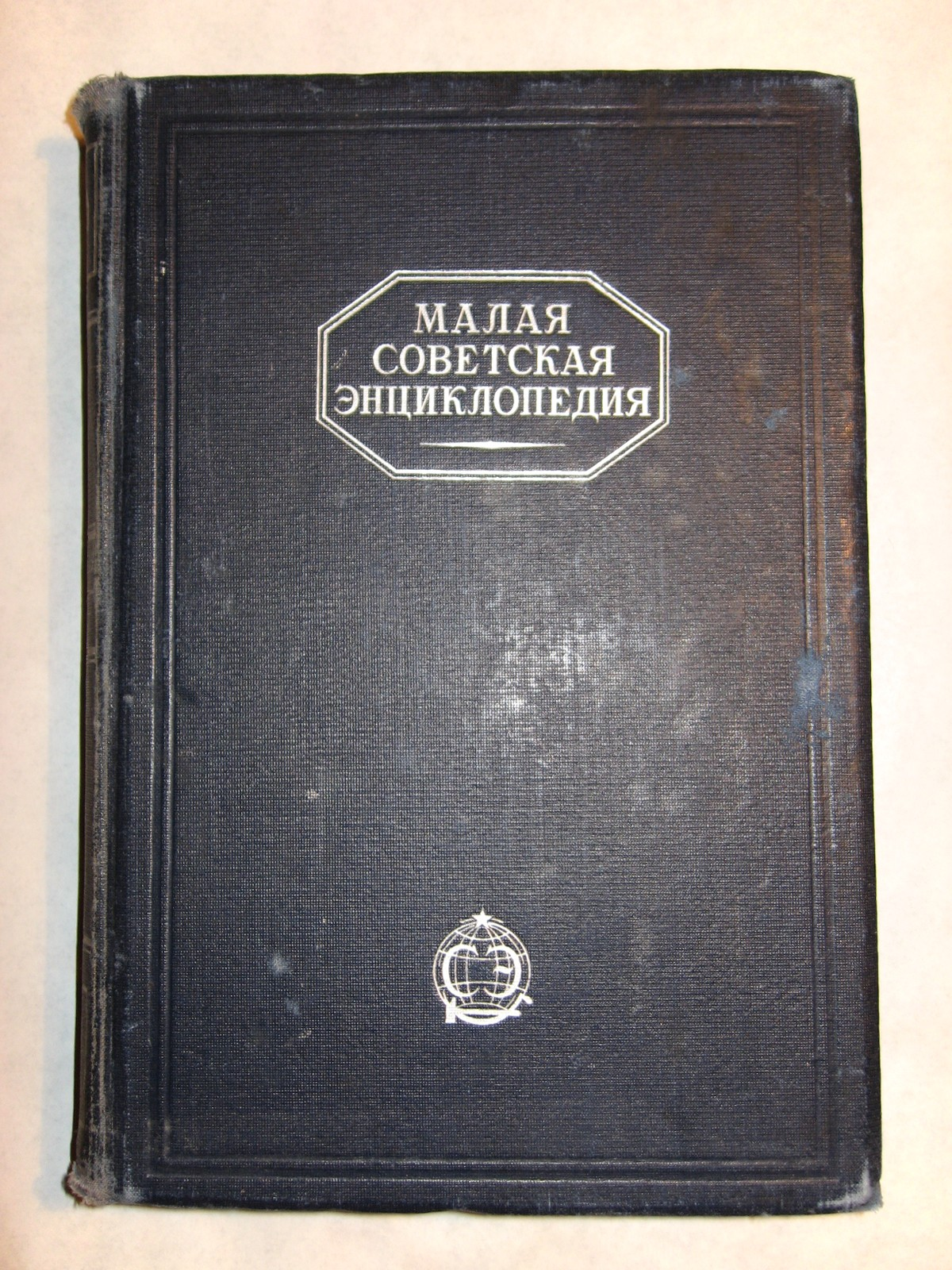
Book cover of first edition in 1928

The Small Soviet Encyclopedia (Russian: Малая советская энциклопедия) was a general encyclopedia published in the Soviet Union. The encyclopedia was published in three editions:

- 1st edition, 10 volumes (between the period 1928–1931) -- the volumes were sold as they were published, hence the different publication dates for the 10 volumes.
- 2nd edition, 11 volumes
- 3rd edition, 10 volumes

== See also ==
- Great Soviet Encyclopedia
