= Nasrullah Khan (emir of Bukhara) =

Emir of Bukhara from 1827 to 1860

Nasr-Allah bin Haydar Tora
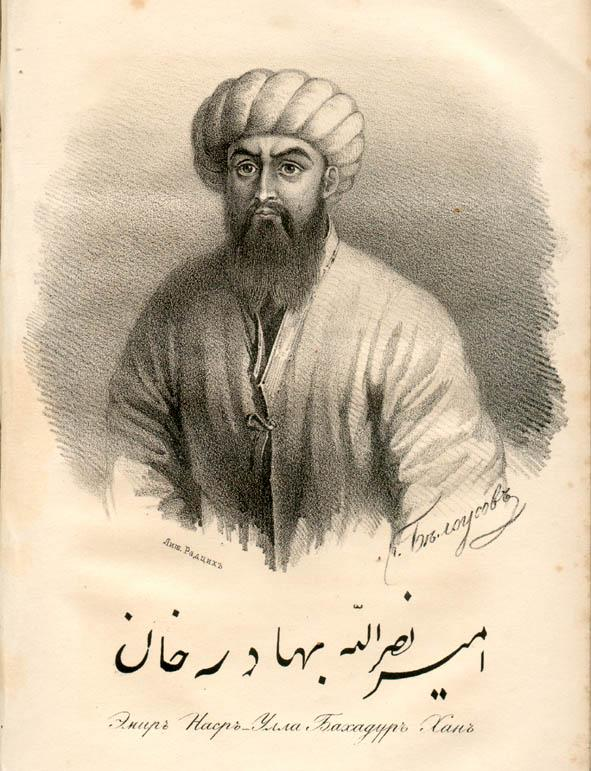

Emir of Bukhara
- Reign: 24 April 1827 – 20 October 1860
- Predecessor: Umar bin Haydar
- Successor: Muzaffar bin Nasrullah
- Born: 1806; Bukhara
- Died: 20 October 1860 (aged 53–54)
Temple name
- Renzong (仁宗)
- House: Manghit dynasty
- Father: Haydar bin Shahmurad
- Religion: Islam

Amir Nasrulloh or Nasrullah Khan (Chagatai and Persian: نصرالله خان), or Amir Muhammad Nasrullah Bahadur Khan, was the Emir of Bukhara from 24 April 1827 to 20 October 1860. His father was Emir Haydar bin Shohmurod (1800–1826). It is hard to determine whether Amir Nasrulloh was Amir Haydar's second or third child. Nasrulloh's position was pivotal to the question of his legitimate birthright succession following Amir Haydar's death. N. V. Khanykov argued that Amir Nasrulloh was the second eldest, and Zafar Namahi Khusrawi contended that he was the second of six sons of Amir Haydar, naming Amir Umar as the third son. However, other subsequent works deny this claim. Ahmad Danish maintained that Amir Umar was older than Amir Nasrulloh, who was the third son. Mohammad Mir Alim Bukhari's Fathnamahi Sultani also described Amir Nasrulloh as the third. Abdulazim Sami and Mulla Ibodulloh and Mulla Muhammad Sharif who wrote Tarikhi Amir Haydar contended that the two princes were of the same age. It seems that most Uzbek and Soviet scholars decided to follow the assertion that Amir Nasulloh was Amir Haydar's second son, most probably following N.V. Khanykov.

== Emergence of Amir Nasrulloh ==
Central Asia was ruled by different local tribal polities in the 19th century. The Manghits ruled in Bukhara, the Mings in Khoqand and the Qonghirats in Khiva. Shahrisabz was ruled by the Kenagas while the Yuz tribes dominated Uratipah. The royal tribal family and local tribal chieftains in smaller regions such as Shahrisabz and Uratipah attempted to stay in power by balancing the external influence from Bukhara and Khoqand.

=== Khitoy-Qipchoq rebellion ===
Khitoy-Qipchoq rebellion played a crucial role in determining Amir Nasrulloh's life as a leader. Khitoys and qipchoqs migrated to Movarounnahr from Dashti Qipchoq and formed tribal confederation like manghits and kenagas by settling in the Miyonkol. Oppressive manner of tax collection and military conscription from Bukhara to withstand the danger from Khivan-Turkmen forces caused the emergence of the rebellion. Amir Nasrulloh's prowess during the Khitoy-Qipshoq rebellion secured his position in Qarshi. He remained the hakim of Qarshi, unlike Amir Husayn who raised Amir Haydar's suspicion of treason and Amir Umar who underperformed during the rebellion.

=== Succession struggle ===
After Haydar's death, Mir Husayn bin Haydar came to power. He died two months later and was succeeded by Umar bin Haydar. Power struggle erupted between the forces of Umar and Nasrulloh. From personal experience, Nasrulloh knew that in order to defeat Umar, he would need the support of the population of Samarqand and Miyonkol (a region between Samarqand and Bukhara). One of his first actions was to enter Samarqand and gaining the support of the local leadership. Then he marched throughout the Zarafshan Valley, where local Uzbek tribes and clans submitted to him along the way. Amir Nasrulloh emerged from succession struggle with his brothers by relying heavily on tribes in Qarshi and Samarqand. Upon his ascension to the Bukharan throne he freed population from taxes for several years and made new appointments among rich, noble and ulama to win their support.

== Reign ==
Nasrulloh bin Haydar Tora was ruler in a time when the Central Asian states were under pressure from the advance of the Russian Empire in the north and the British Indian Empire in the south. Nasrulloh is best known in the West as the Emir who imprisoned and eventually executed in 1842 the British envoys Charles Stoddart and Arthur Conolly, and imprisoned but eventually released Joseph Wolff, who came in 1843 to seek news of them. In Tsarist Russian and Soviet historiography Amir Nasrulloh was viewed as a amiri qassob (butcher emir) bloodthirsty, oppressive and despotic leader because he executed his brothers and waged military campaigns against his neighbors in the region.

=== Relations between Bukhara and Shahrisabz ===
The Manghits and the kenagas migrated to Movarounnahr from Dashti Qipshoq and their relationship ranged from cooperation to competition. Each tribe craved for more power and influence which led to the organization of tribal confederation. This confederation was active for about 150 years until the Russian conquest of 1865. Shahrisabz was the stronghold of the kenagas ruling elite that disobeyed Bukharan Emirate to preserve its independence. The relationship between Amir Nasrulloh and kenagas leaders of Shahrisabz was complicated. However, it continued serving as political sanctuary for dethroned leaders of Bukhara, Khoqand and even Afghanistan. Such situation increased Bukhara and Khoqand's will to subjugate Shahrisabz. The Kenagas ruling families attempted to balance Bukhara and Khoqand through familial ties too.

=== Relations between Bukhara and Khoqand ===
The Manghits of Bukhara and the Mings of Khoqand competed for supremacy in the region. Both political entities attempted to legitimize their rule through dynastic justification of belonging to a powerful tribe, local royalty and more so through Islamic, religious reputation. Amir Nasrulloh and Muhammad Alikhon of Khoqand both looked up to the Ottoman Empire for different religious titles to legitimize their rule as just leaders in the region. Nasrullah bin Haydar Tora organized several unsuccessful military campaigns against the Khoqand Khanate. In 1839, he declared war against Khoqand due to their building of the Pishaghar fort near the Bukhara front. He conquered Khojand twice in 1839 and 1841, forcing the Khan of Khoqand into a peace in his favor and took Uratipah and Khojand as compensation. The Khan of Khoqand was also forced to pay a heavy amount and recognize him as lord, putting his name on the coins and the khutbah. After a revolt in Khojand, the Emir's forces occupied Khojand and Khoqand. When Muhammad Alikhon married Padshah Ayim, a widow of his father, the religious authority of Khoqand disapproved his act and looked at Bukhara to interfere and establish the Islamic order, sharia which was one of the corner stones in Bukhara. After years of proxy wars in and around Uratipah competing for hegemony in the region Amir Nasrulloh invaded Khoqand in 1842. Nodirabegim a notable poetess, a widow of Mohammad Umarkhan and other members of the royal family were all executed. Avaz Muhammad's condemnation of Amir Nasrulloh for his harsh ruling contributed to the characterization of Amir Nasrulloh as cruel and ruthless even though the execution of a toppled ruler was not uncommon in Central Asia. Amir Nasrulloh's ruthlessness in Khoqand and his imposition of heavy taxes betrayed Khoqand ulama and citizens’ expectations. Although the Ming rule in Khoqand was restored by Sheralikhon with the help of Qirghiz and Qipchoq tribal backing, Bukhara continued interfering into the internal politics of Khoqand which proved to be effective in weakening Khoqand even after the death of Amir Nasrulloh.

=== Relations between Bukhara and Khiva ===
Bukhara's relationship with Khiva emerged and evolved around the issue of Turkmens, controlling Marv and ensuring caravan trade route safety between Russia and Bukhara. Marv was also important to interact with Qajar Iran as it was a border town between Bukhara and Qajar Iran. Turkmen tribes played a crucial role in determining their importance through changing allegiances from Iran to Khiva and from Khiva to Bukhara in different periods. Western and Russian travelers who came to Khiva and Afghanistan left their travelogues and memoirs which offer valuable information on complex relationships between Khiva and Russia, Khiva and Bukhara, and Bukhara and Afghanistan. Russian, Turkmen, Afghan and approaching British factors are important to understand the relationship Bukhara had with its surroundings. Amir Nasrulloh succeeded in Marv but failed in Balkh.

Khiva and Bukhara had been competing militarily and politically. In the conflicts, Russia-Bukhara caravans were attacked by Khiva to pressure Russia and Bukhara. On the other hand, Russia maintained an aggressive position towards Khiva for the Khivan subjects’ raids on the border. Under such circumstances, Amir Nasrulloh had a conflict with Allaqulikhan and from the year 1842 peace agreement followed.

(Lee, Kwang Tae,329-330).

=== Relations between Bukhara and Afghanistan ===
Amir Nasrulloh's policy towards Balkh determined the relationship with Afghan dynasties; his first expedition in 1832 resulted in the allegiance of Balkh. This expedition was one of many that followed because Afghan dynasties were busy with containing Qajar threat that began in 1830s.

The Russo-Afghan accord created concern among the British officials in India, who decided to launch a preemptive invasion to Afghanistan in 1839 when Dust Muḥammad Khan decided to seek refuge in Bukhara with one thousand men. Amir Nasrulloh failed to maintain control over the expelled Afghan ruler. At the end the British government decided to keep Afghan regime as a buffer zone and signed a peace treaty in 1855 and enabled Dust Muhammad Khan to incorporate Balkh

(Lee, Kwang Tae,354,360, 362).

Political circumstances forming inside and geopolitical circumstances forming outside of Bukhara, Khiva and Khoqand's struggle for more influence in the region led to constant military campaigns of Amir Nasrulloh.

== Legitimacy ==
Amir Nasrulloh used political and religious symbolism to legitimize his rule in Bukhara. He adopted different controversial titles like khan and amir al-muminin. However, the most widely repeated title was sayyid, which may have also served as the basis for the addition of amir to the beginning part of his name. It is complicated to draw a clear line between sufism and ulama in the first half of the 19th century Bukhara, because competition within shaykhs and what they taught to their murids brought difference and division, mixture of different sufi tariqahs in Bukhara. This led shaykhs to incorporate more silsilas and tariqahs from other geographical areas, such as India, into their curriculum. India became a source of inspiration for Sufi representation in Bukhara, as many left for India and brought competing ideas concerning Sufism and tried implementing them upon their return, which increased competition among local Sufi shaykhs. Different modes of sufism and Indian influence and local religious authority show how changing and competing narratives existed and how Islam remained a significant part of the Bukharan society in the first half of the 19th century.

For example, Amir Shohmurod represented himself as a Mujaddidi shayx, and a sufi, his son, Amir Haydar, was a member of the ulama and a sufi. Amir Nasrulloh chose a different path. His religious legitimation happened through shrine veneration that became more notable when he was appointed as the hakim of Qarshi by Amir Haydar. Amir Nasrulloh visited the Bahauddin Naqshbandi shrine multiple times before his military campaigns against his brother Amir Umar. Amir Nasrulloh implemented sharia by appointing Rahmonberdi Turkman as rais who urged and compelled people to follow Islamic Law. Implementation of Shariah and shrine visitation helped Amir Nasrulloh consolidate his power base in Bukhara.

== Reforms ==
=== Economic ===
The Bukharan Emirate during Amir Nasrulloh's reign recovered economically due to trade relations with Russian Empire in the first half of the 19th century. O.D. Chekhovich and M.K. Rozhkova's analysis of the statistical and archival data showed increasing trade and competition of Central Asian merchants through influx of British products into Central Asia and outflow of Russian hard currency from Russia into Central Asia. Trade relations show that Bukharan Emirate was a dynamic political entity interacting with neighboring countries especially with colonial powers such as Russia and Britain which provided impetus for Bukhara under Amir Nasrulloh to modernize independently.

=== Administrative ===
The evolution of the administrative system under Amir Nasrulloh culminated with the elimination of the controversial post of qushbegi. Qushbegi is viewed as Prime Minister, vizier, falconer or camp master in different periods as the post of qushbegi evolved from hunting to vizier. Mohammad Hakim qushbegi inherited his position of qushbegi following his father Utkur Bi's death. Muhammad Hakim became one of the strongest qushbegis during Amir Haydar's and then during Amir Nasrulloh's reign. He demonstrated his loyalty to Amir Nasrulloh by opening one of the gates of Bukhara during the succession struggle between Amir Nasrulloh and Amir Umar. The very fact that he was from manghit tribe helped him install his relatives in high-ranking positions within the Emirate. His loyalty to the manghit royal family allowed him to check Amir Nasrulloh's meal from poisoning and manage the customs office. Military decisions and appointments to posts usually bypassed qushbegi. Muhammad Hakim qushbegi was executed in 1837-8 by Amir Nasrulloh under the pretext of treason, assumed to collaborate with the British to organize a political plot against the ruler. After purging Muhammad Hakim qushbegi the post of qushbegi ceased to exist, and Amir Nasrulloh employed viziers who had no tribal affiliation.

=== Military ===
Amir Nasrulloh's establishment of a standing army resembling sarbaz in Qajar Iran and nizami jadid in Ottoman Turkey led to the modernization and centralization of Bukhara. The sarbaz military consisted of sarbazi kefiran va sarbazani qizilbash who were Russian and Persian slaves. This new standing army was trained by an Iranian fugitive Abdulsamad who served in India, Afghanistan and Iran.

First and foremost, the sarbaz brought in a change in the Bukharan military system. Their physical presence was hardly felt because they remained outside the city of Bukhara. The cavalry, which were primarily filled up with Uzbeks, were removed from the military register of the standing army in the city of Bukhara and transferred into the category of irregular forces. The transition of 13,000 former forces made a significant impact on Bukhara society. Those reserve Uzbeks were said to engage in economic activities in peacetime and thus increased labor supply.

(Lee, Kwang Tae, 437-438)

== Death ==
Nasr-Allah bin Haydar Tora died on 20 October 1860, being succeeded by his son, Muzaffar bin Nasrullah.

Preceded by Umar bin Haydar	Emir of Bukhara; 1827–1860	Succeeded by Muzaffar bin Nasrullah

== Bibliography ==
- Fitzroy Maclean: A Person from England and Other Travellers, 1958
- Fitzroy Maclean, Eastern Approaches, chap. 6 "Bokhara the Noble", 1949.
- Joseph Wolff: Narrative of a Mission to Bokhara, in the years 1843-1845, to ascertain the fate of Colonel Stoddart and Captain Conolly. London, J. W. Parker, 1845.
- Lee, Kwang Tae. (2020) “The Myth of the Butcher Amir: Tribal Politics and Early Modernization in 19th century Central Asia”.
- Lee, Jonathan (1996). The "Ancient Supremacy": Bukhara, Afghanistan and the Battle for Balkh, 1731-1901. BRILL. p. 276. ISBN 9789004103993.
- Wilde, Andreas (2016). What is Beyond the River?: Power, Authority, and Social Order in Transoxania 18th-19th Centuries. Verlag der Österreichischen Akademie der Wissenschaften. ISBN 978-3-7001-7866-8.
- Wilde, Andreas: What is Beyond the River?: Power, Authority, and Social Order in Transoxania 18th-19th Centuries, Volume 2. Austrian Academy of Sciences, 2016.
