= Tursunjan Madrasah =

Madrasa in Bukhara, Uzbekistan

Tursunjan madrasah
- Tursunjon madrasasi
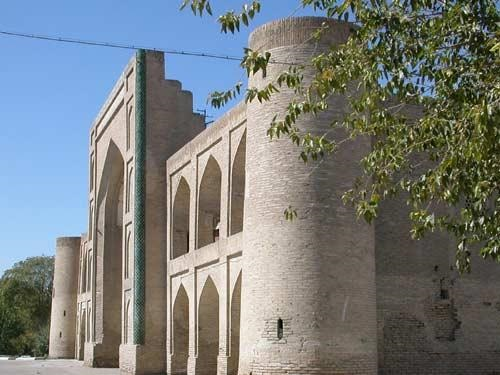
- Interactive map of the Tursunjan madrasah area
- Alternative names: Domullo Tursunjan madrasah, Mullo Tursunjon madrasah

General information
- Status: under the protection of the state
- Type: Madrasah
- Architectural style: Central Asian architecture
- Location: Mehtar Ambar Street, Bukhara Region, Uzbekistan
- Coordinates: 39°46′26″N 64°24′46″E
- Construction started: 1805
- Construction stopped: 1806
- Owner: State property. Bukhara Region Cultural Heritage Department on the basis of operational management rights
- Affiliation: Domullo Tursunjan; Amir Haydar

Technical details
- Material: brick, wood, stone and ganch
- Size: 97 cells
- Floor count: 2 floors

Tursunjan madrasah (Domullo Tursunjan madrasah, Mullo Tursunjon madrasah) is one of the Bukhara madrasas. A two-story madrasah building located in the historical center of the city of Bukhara, Bukhara Region, Republic of Uzbekistan. It is included in the national list of real estate objects of material and cultural heritage of Uzbekistan.

== History ==
Tursunjan madrasah was built in 1805–1806 in Otaliq guzar, during the reign of Mangit dynasty in Bukhara Emirate. Its construction was started by Domulla Tursunjon, a merchant from Bukhara, but due to his death, according to his will, the construction was finished by Amir Haydar (1800-1806). Abu Abdurahman Abdullah Domullo informed that Tursunjan was a merchant. Mullo Tursunjon madrasah is wrongly indicated in the history book of Bukhara by Zhora Barakayev and Yoldosh Haydarov that it was built in 1796–1797. Mullo Tursunjan madrasah was founded in 1805–1806 in the work "History of Bukhara and translation by scholars". This madrasah is one of the largest and fourth-level madrasahs of the highest category in the city of Bukhara. According to the information of Abdurauf Fitrat of the Tursunjan madrasah, the annual endowment amount is 140,000 tenge. In the madrasa, classes were conducted by mudarris. Amir Haydar ruled the Bukhara Emirate in 1800–1826. During his time, reforms were implemented in the field of education in Bukhara Emirate. Two students lived in each room of the Tursunjan madrasah. The madrasah still exists today.

== Architecture ==
The Tursunjan madrasah has two floors and consists of 97 rooms. This madrasah was built in the style of Central Asian architecture. The madrasah is built of brick, wood, stone and ganch. Madrasah is now located on Mehtar Ambar street.
