= Umar bin Haydar =

Emir of Bukhara from 1826 to 1827

Emir of Bukhara
- Reign: 1826–24 April 1827
- Predecessor: Mir Hussein bin Haydar
- Successor: Nasrulla
- Born: c. 1810; Bukhara
- Died: 1827; Kokand
- Burial: Bukhara
- House: Manghit dynasty
- Father: Haydar bin Shahmurad
- Religion: Islam

Umar bin Haydar (Chagatai and Persian: عمر بن حیدر) was the Uzbek Emir of Bukhara from December 1826 to April 1827. His father was emir Haydar bin Shahmurad (1800–1826).

Emir Haydar died in 1826 and was succeeded by Mir Hussein bin Haydar. After Mir Hussein bin Haydar, Umar bin Haydar came to power. He took the throne of the emirate at the age of 16, replacing his deceased elder brother, Mir Hussein ibn Haydar, who ruled the emirate only two months after the death of his father, Haydar bin Shahmurad. Before Haydar's death, Umar had served as the governor of Karmina.

Near the end of his reign, Bukhara was besieged by his brother Nasrullah for several months. Eventually, on 24 April 1827 Amir Umar was overthrown and Amir Nasrullah became the new ruler.

== Literature ==
- Akhmad Donish, Puteshestviye iz Bukhary Peterburg. Dushanbe, 1960.
- Holzwarth, Wolfgang. "Community Elders and State Agents: Īlbēgīs in the Emirate of Bukhara around 1900." Eurasian Studies (2011).
- Bregel, Y. (2009). The new Uzbek states: Bukhara, Khiva and Khoqand: C. 1750–1886. In N. Di Cosmo, A. Frank, & P. Golden (Eds.), The Cambridge History of Inner Asia: The Chinggisid Age (pp. 392–411). Cambridge: Cambridge University Press

Preceded by Mir Hussein bin Haydar	Emir of Bukhara; 1826–1827	Succeeded by Nasrulla
