= Amir Nasrullah Madrasah =

Madrasa in Bukhara, Uzbekistan

- Amir Nasrulloh Madrasasi

General information
- Type: Madrasah
- Architectural style: Central Asian architecture
- Location: Bukhara Khanate, Uzbekistan
- Opened: 1277 Hijri
- Owner: Amir Nasrullah Khan

Technical details
- Material: brick, wood, stone and ganch
- Size: 7 cells

Amir Nasrullah madrasah is located in Bukhara. The madrasah has not been preserved today. Amir Nasrullah madrasah was founded in 1860 by Amir Nasrullah Khan, the ruler of the Mangite Dynasty, who ruled Bukhara in Poyi Astana Guzar. This madrasah is also mentioned in sources as Poyi Astana. Sharif Makhdum wrote in his work that the madrasah was built in the town of Kochqorbek in the month of Muharram 1277 Hijri (July-August 1860). Historian Muhammad Mir Olim Bukhari wrote in his work that Amir Nasrul Khan built a madrasah near the grave of his father Amir Sa'id.

Research scientist Abdusattor Jumanazarov studied a number of foundation documents related to this madrasah and provided information related to the madrasah. In the document of the endowment, it is indicated on the top that "foundation mosque and madrasah Poyi astana". According to the document, the madrasah was built of brick and wood and consisted of classrooms and rooms. There was a street to the west of the madrasah, a high mosque of Guzar to the north, and a road to the south and east. Amir Nasrullah Khan himself appointed a mutawwali to the madrasah. The madrasah is not leased to one person for more than three years. The endowment document was approved by the seal of Amir Nasrullah, Qazi ul-Quzzat Saburhoja ibn Akhund Mullah Amonullahhoja and a number of other persons. There is also information about the mudarris who worked in the madrasah. In the foundation document of Amir Nasrullah madrasah, the names of the mudarris such as Mufti of Sadr, Mullah Arif, Mullah Abdugafur, and Mullah Yusuf are mentioned. Sadri Zia wrote that there were 7 cells in this madrasah. Amir Nasrullah madrasah consisted of 7 rooms. This madrasah was built in the style of Central Asian architecture. The madrasah is built of brick, wood, stone and ganch.
