= Chor Minor =

Historic gatehouse in Bukhara, Uzbekistan

Coordinates: 40°23′9″N 49°50′16″E

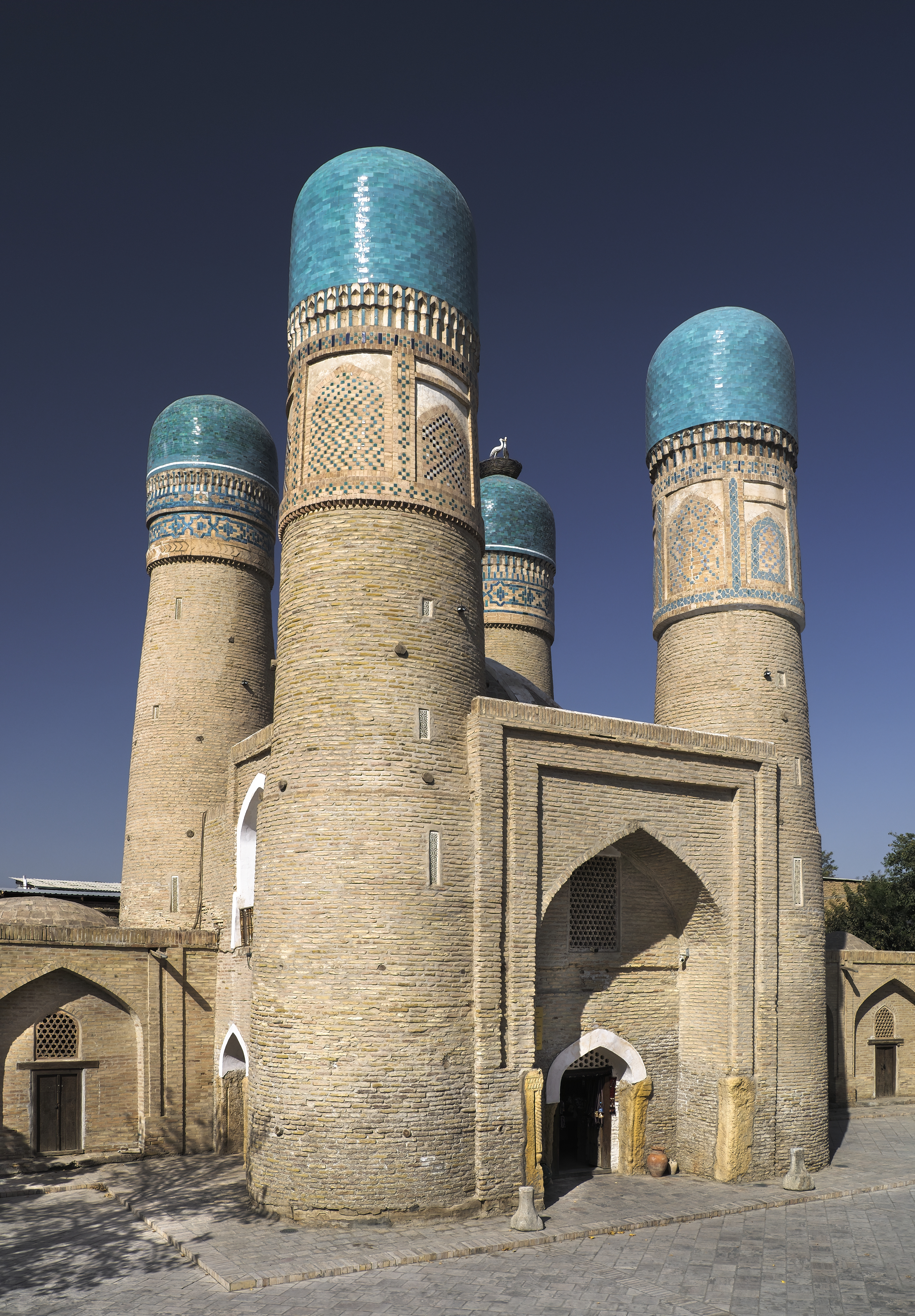
- Chor Minor from the southwest

Religion
- Affiliation: Sunni Islam
- Status: Gatehouse

Location
- Location: Bukhara, Uzbekistan
- Interactive map of Chor Minor

Architecture
- Type: Mosque
- Completed: 1807
- Dome: 4

Chor Minor (Char Minar Uzbek: Chor minor), alternatively known as the Madrasah of Khalif Niyaz-kul, is a historic gatehouse for a now-destroyed madrasa in the historic city of Bukhara, Uzbekistan. It is located in a lane northeast of the Lyab-i Hauz complex. It is protected as a cultural heritage monument, and also it is a part of the World Heritage Site Historic Centre of Bukhara. In Persian, the name of the monument means "four minarets", referring to the building's four towers.

== History ==
The structure was built by Khalif Niyaz-kul, a wealthy Bukharan of Turkmen origin in 1807 under the rule of the Manghit dynasty. The four towered structure is sometimes mistaken for a gate to the madras that once existed behind the structure, however, the Char-Minar is actually a complex of buildings with two functions, ritual and shelter. Originally, it was a part of a complex of a madrasa, which was demolished. The building has no analogs in the architecture of Bukhara, and the inspiration and motives of Niyazkul are unclear.

== Architecture ==
The main edifice is a mosque. In spite of its unusual outward shape, the building has a typical interior for a Central Asian mosque. Owing to the building's cupola, the room has good acoustic properties, and therefore takes on special significance of 'dhikr-hana' – a place for ritualized 'dhikr' ceremonies of Sufi, the liturgy of which often include recitation, singing, and instrumental music. On either side of the central edifice are located dwelling rooms, some of which have collapsed, leaving only their foundations visible. Consequently, for full functioning of madrasa, only of classroom and some utility rooms is lacking. However, it was common practice that so-called madrasahs had no lecture rooms or, even if they had, no lectures had been given in them. These madrasahs were employed as student hospices.

On the esplanade to the right from Char-Minar is a pool, likely of the same age as the rest of the building complex. Char Minar is now surrounded mainly by small houses and shops along its perimeter.

=== Towers ===
The towers of Chor Minor are not minarets. Three of them were used for storage, and one has a staircase leading to the top floor. All of them are topped by domes covered by blue ceramic tiles. Each of four towers have different deco rational motifs. Some say that elements of decoration reflect the four religions known to Central Asians. One can find elements reminiscent of a cross, a Christian fish motif, and a Buddhist praying-wheel, in addition to Zoroastrian and Islamic motifs.

In 1995, due to an underground brook, one of the four towers collapsed. Emergency assistance was applied for and granted by UNESCO under the World Heritage Fund. Although the collapse destabilized the entire structure, the authorities were anxious to keep awareness of the disaster to a minimum. Without explanation, the building disappeared from the list of sights and after hurried reconstruction of the tower "using non-traditional building material, such as poor quality cement and steel" Chor Minor returned as one of the most popular sights of the city, yet the event has been kept secret ever since.

== Gallery ==
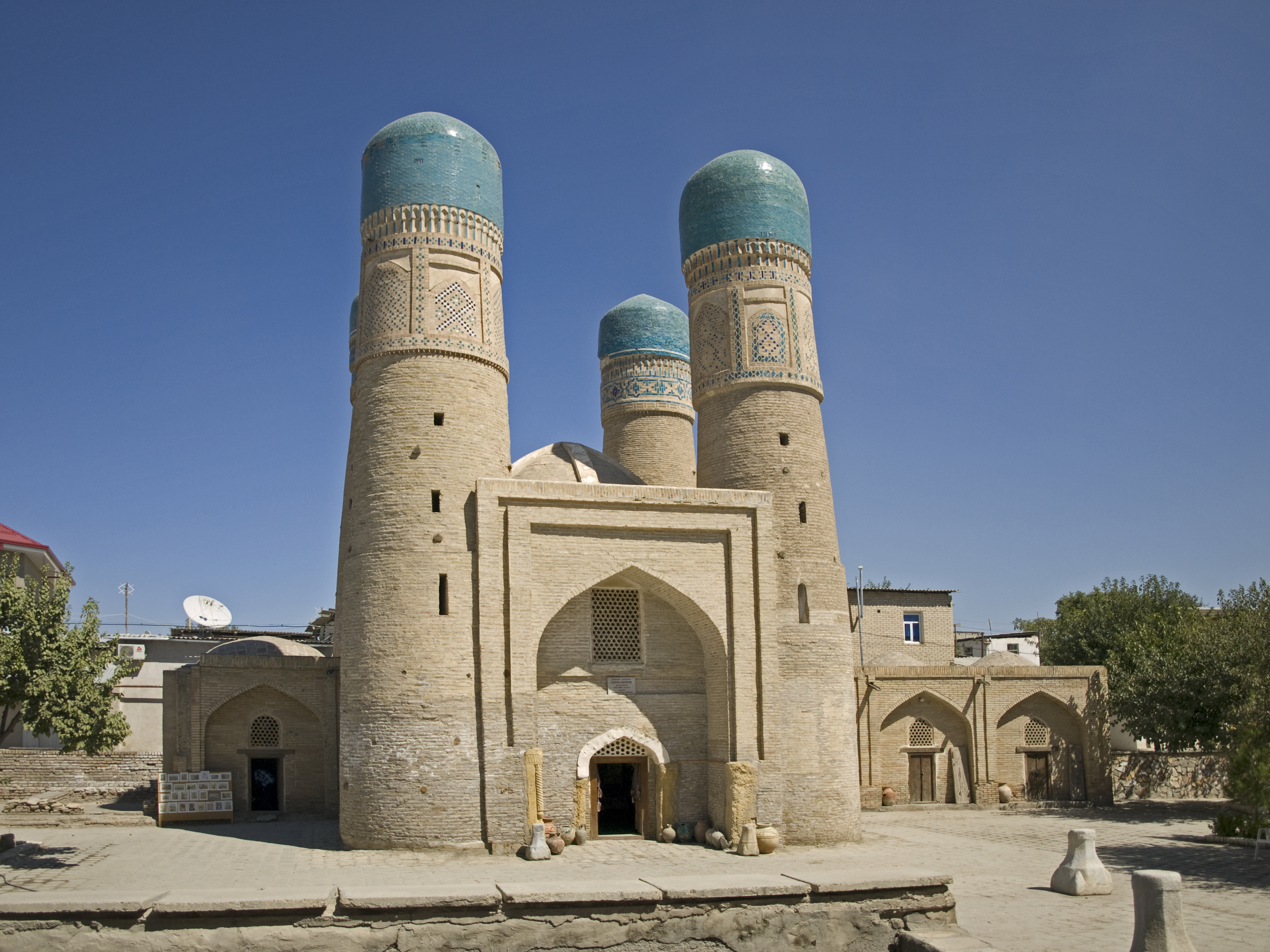

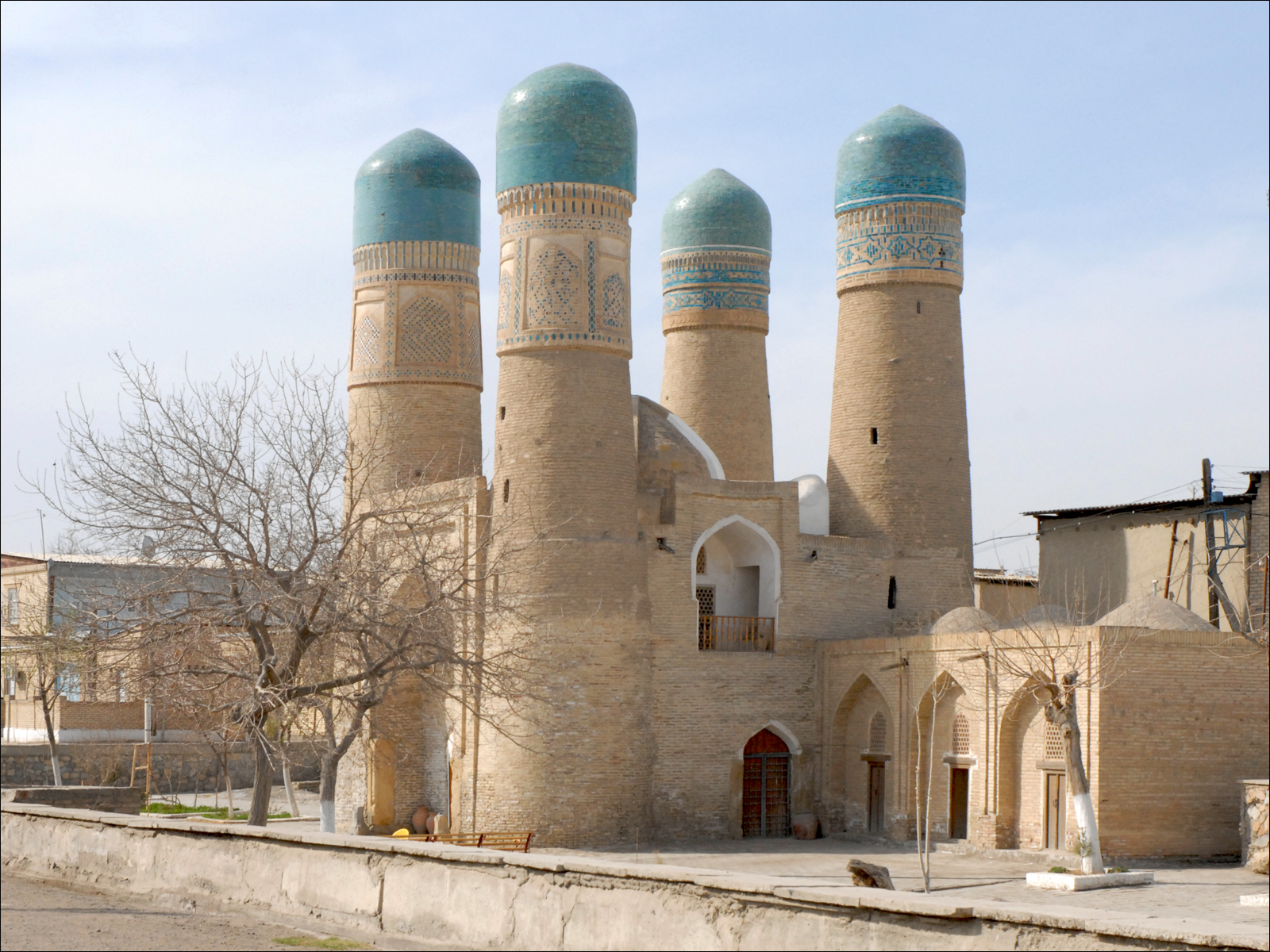

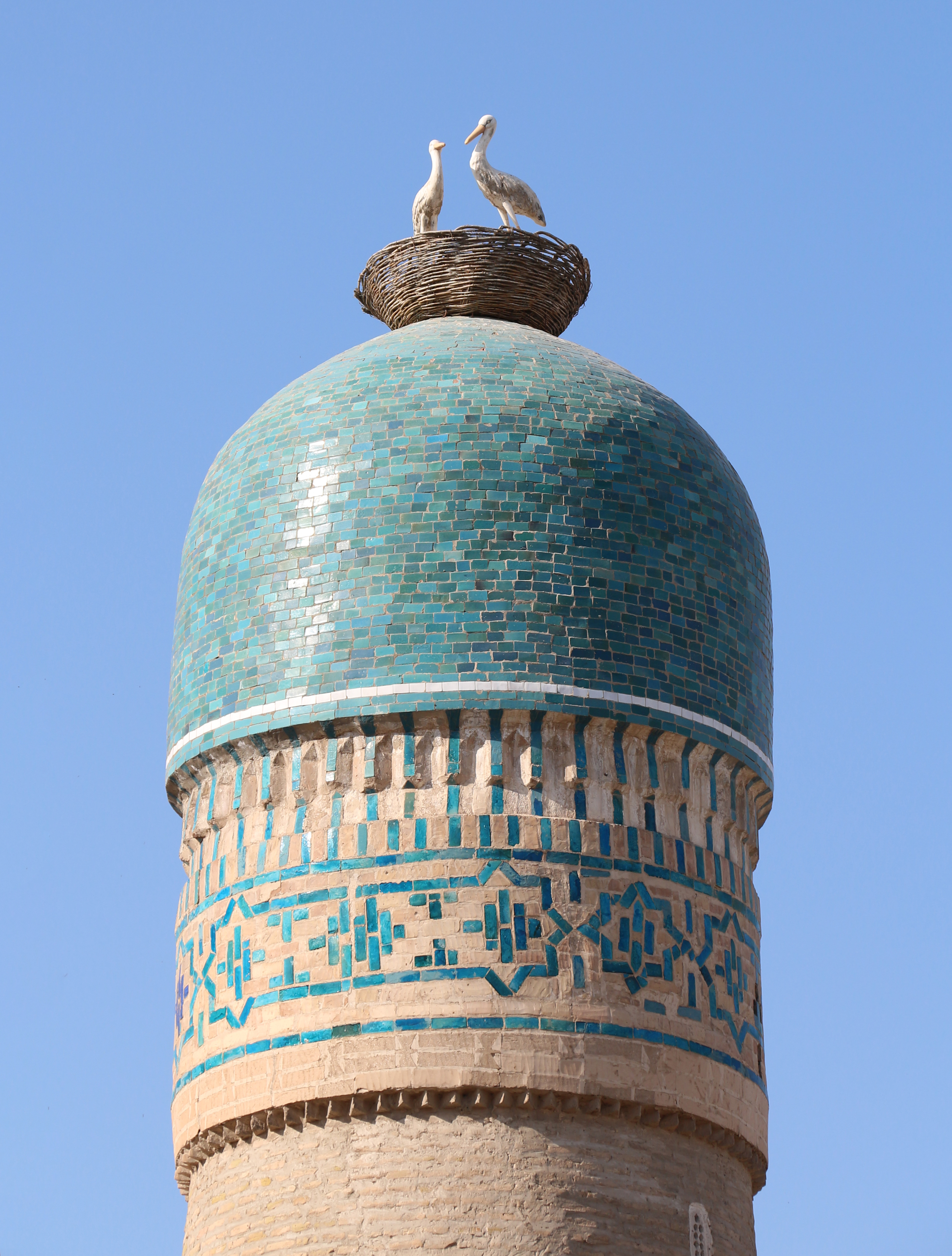

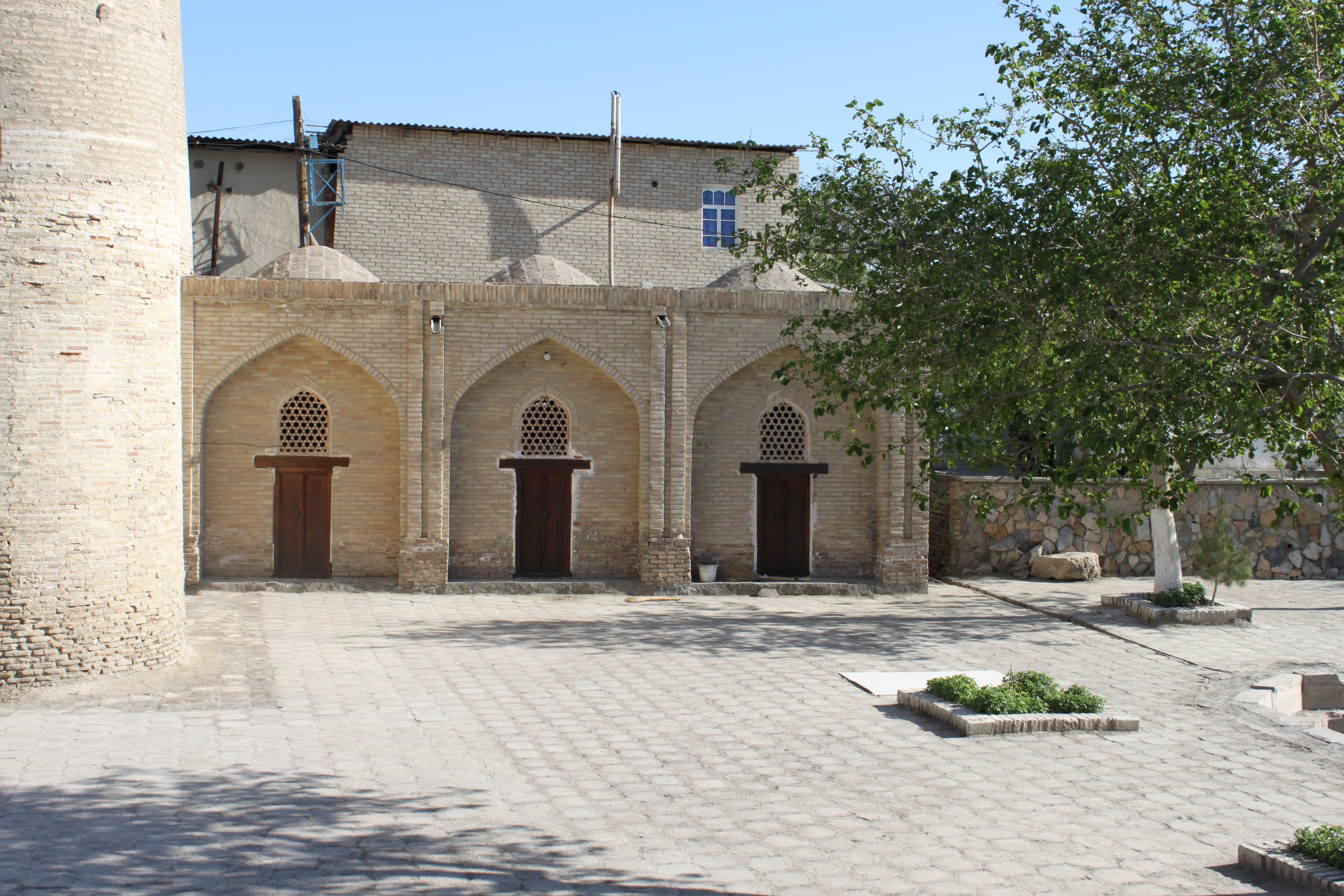

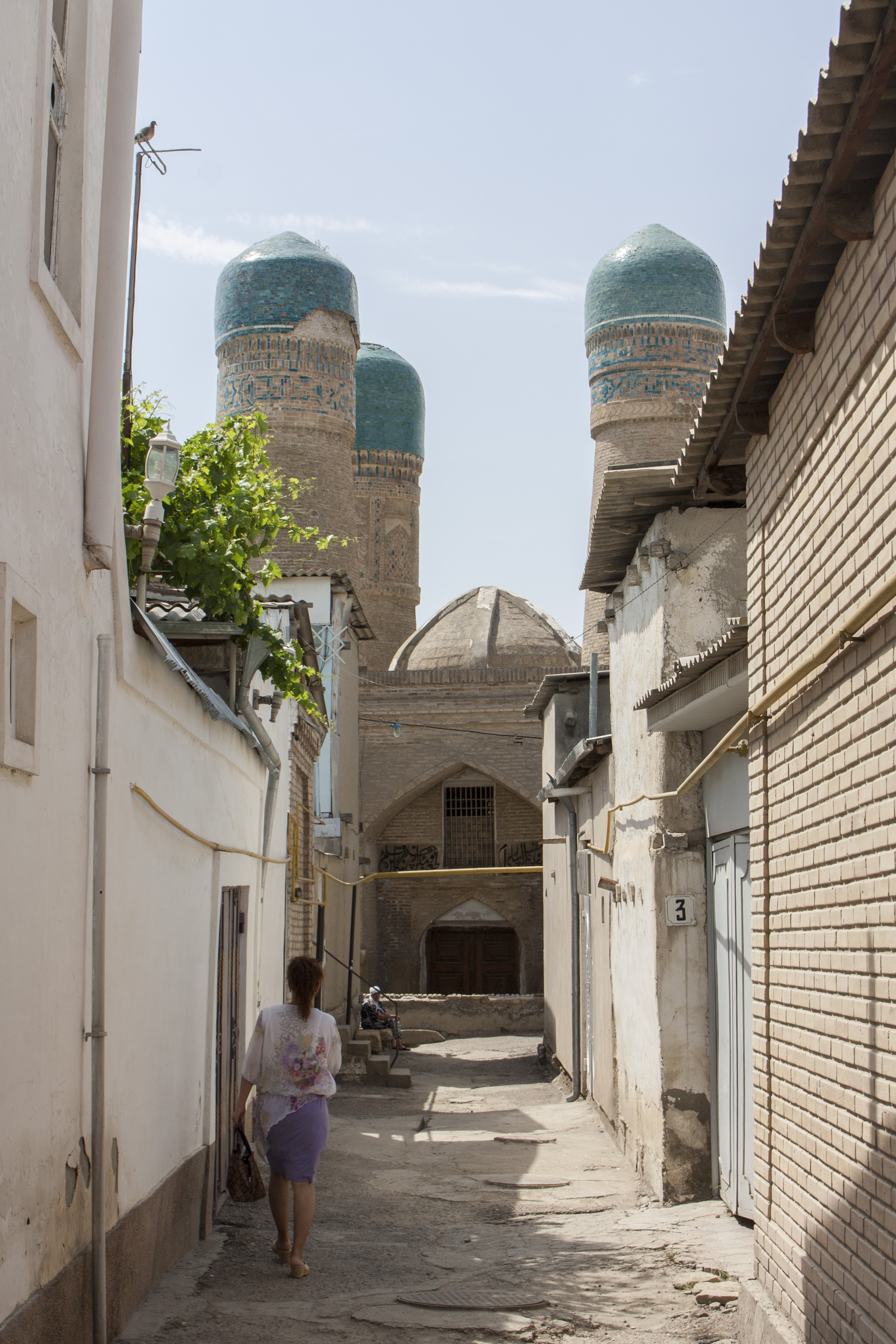
