= Daniyal Biy =

Atalyk of Bukhara from 1758 to 1785

Atalyk of Bukhara
- Reign: 1758–1785
- Predecessor: Muhammad Rahim Khan
- Successor: Shahmurad
- Born: 1720; Bukhara
- Died: 1785 (aged 64–65); Bukhara
- Burial: Bukhara
- House: Manghit dynasty
- Father: Khudoyar biy
- Religion: Islam

Daniyal Biy (Chagatai and Persian: دانیال بیگ, 1720–1785) was the Uzbek ruler (atalyk) of Bukhara from 1758 to 1785. His father was Khudoyar biy. The previous ruler of the Bukharan Khanate, Muhammad Rahim Khan, died in 1758 and was succeeded by Daniyal Biy, his uncle.

== Internal policy ==
Information from sources about the internal situation of the Bukhara Khanate in the era of Danial-biy is extremely insufficient and contradictory. One of the Bukhara historians of the first quarter of the 19th century, Abdul-Karim Bukhari, noted that under Danial-biy, Bukhara was cheap and the country was distinguished by its improvement. Daniyal-biy, according to Muhammad Yakub Bukhari, like Muhammad Rahim-khan, enjoyed the fame of generosity and a humane ruler, although he did not delve into state affairs, especially financial matters. The position of the central government was fragile. The state was actually ruled by the supreme kushbegi Muhammad Davlat and the chief Bukharian judge Nizamiddin, who mainly cared only about their enrichment.

== Foreign policy ==
In 1761, Daniyal-biy sent an embassy to the Russian Empire headed by Quli-bek tupchi-bashi

The embassies of Irnazar Maksudov contributed to the strengthening of Bukhara-Russian relations. In the conditions of economic isolation of Central Asia, the decline in the importance of the Great Silk Road, Irnazar Maksudov put forward a bold and complex idea - a project of turning trade relations between East Asia and Western Europe on their original path, into the Bukhara-Russian borders.

Danial-biy strengthened state ties with the Ottoman Empire. They sent three embassies to Istanbul, headed by Irnazar Maksudov, which was passed through Russia and twice by Muhammad Sharif in 1783-1784, which were met by the Ottoman Sultan Abdul-Hamid I (1773-1789). In response, Abdul-Hamid I sent an embassy headed by Mahmud Said to the Bukhara state, which arrived in Bukhara after the death of Danial-biy in 1786 and was received by his son Shahmurad.

== Death ==
Daniyalbiy died in 1785 and was buried near the grave of Bahauddin Naqshband in Bukhara. After Danial-biy, his heir and eldest son Shahmurad came to power, who also passed on his title "Amir ul-umaro" and the post of atalik.

== Literature ==
- Akhmad Donish, Puteshestviye iz Bukhary Peterburg. Dushanbe, 1960.
- Holzwarth, Wolfgang. "Community Elders and State Agents: Īlbēgīs in the Emirate of Bukhara around 1900." Eurasian Studies (2011).
- Bregel, Y. (2009). The new Uzbek states: Bukhara, Khiva and Khoqand: C. 1750–1886. In N. Di Cosmo, A. Frank, & P. Golden (Eds.), The Cambridge History of Inner Asia: The Chinggisid Age (pp. 392–411). Cambridge: Cambridge University Press

| Preceded by Muhammad Rahim Khan | Atalyk of Bukhara; 1758–1785 | Succeeded by Shahmurad |
