= Arthur Conolly =

British intelligence officer (1807–1842)

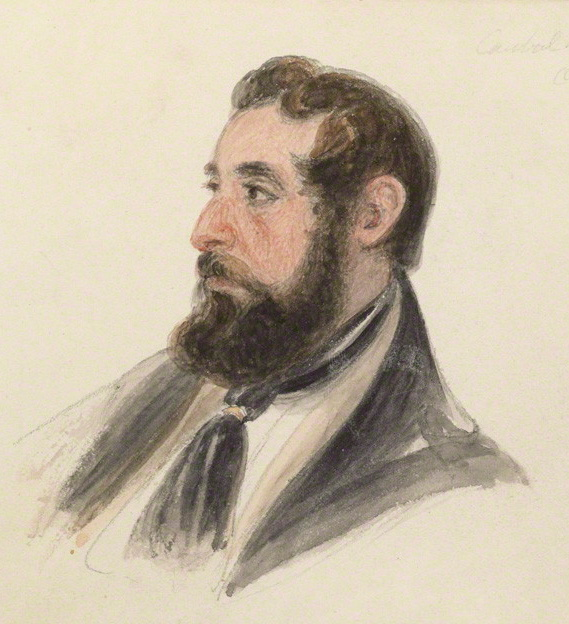
- Portrait by James Atkinson, c. 1840
- Born: 2 July 1807; London, England
- Died: 17 June 1842 (aged 34); Bukhara, Emirate of Bukhara

Arthur Conolly (2 July 1807, London – 17 June 1842) was a British intelligence officer, explorer and writer. He was a captain of the 6th Bengal Light Cavalry in the service of the British East India Company. He participated in many reconnaissance missions into Central Asia and coined the term The Great Game to describe the struggle between the United Kingdom and the Russian Empire for domination over Central Asia.

== Biography ==
A descendant of an Ó Conghalaigh clan of Ireland, Conolly was a cousin of Sir William Macnaghten, Secretary of the British East India Company's Political and Secret Department.

As a sixteen-year-old impressionable cadet, he sailed to India on the Grenville and listened to Reginald Heber, the newly-appointed Bishop of Calcutta, evangelise. Thereafter, Conolly sought to win over Muslims to a "kindlier" view of Christians, the first step - in his view - of propagating the Gospel.

In July 1840, in a correspondence with Major Henry Rawlinson, who had been recently appointed as the political agent in Kandahar, Conolly stated:

You've a great game, a noble game, before you.

Conolly believed that Rawlinson's new post gave him the opportunity to advance humanitarianism in Afghanistan, and summed up his hopes:

If the British Government would only play the grand game – help Russia cordially to all that she has a right to expect – shake hands with Persia – get her all possible amends from Oosbegs – force the Bokhara Amir to be just to us, the Afghans, and other Oosbeg states, and his own kingdom – but why go on; you know my, at any rate in one sense, enlarged views. Inshallah! The expediency, nay the necessity of them will be seen, and we shall play the noble part that the first Christian nation of the world ought to fill."

Often travelling in disguise, he used the name "Khan Ali" in a word-play on his true name. In late 1829, he left Moscow for the Caucasus and Central Asia, arriving in Herat in September 1830 and in India in January 1831. In 1834, he published an account of his trip, which established his reputation as a traveller and writer.

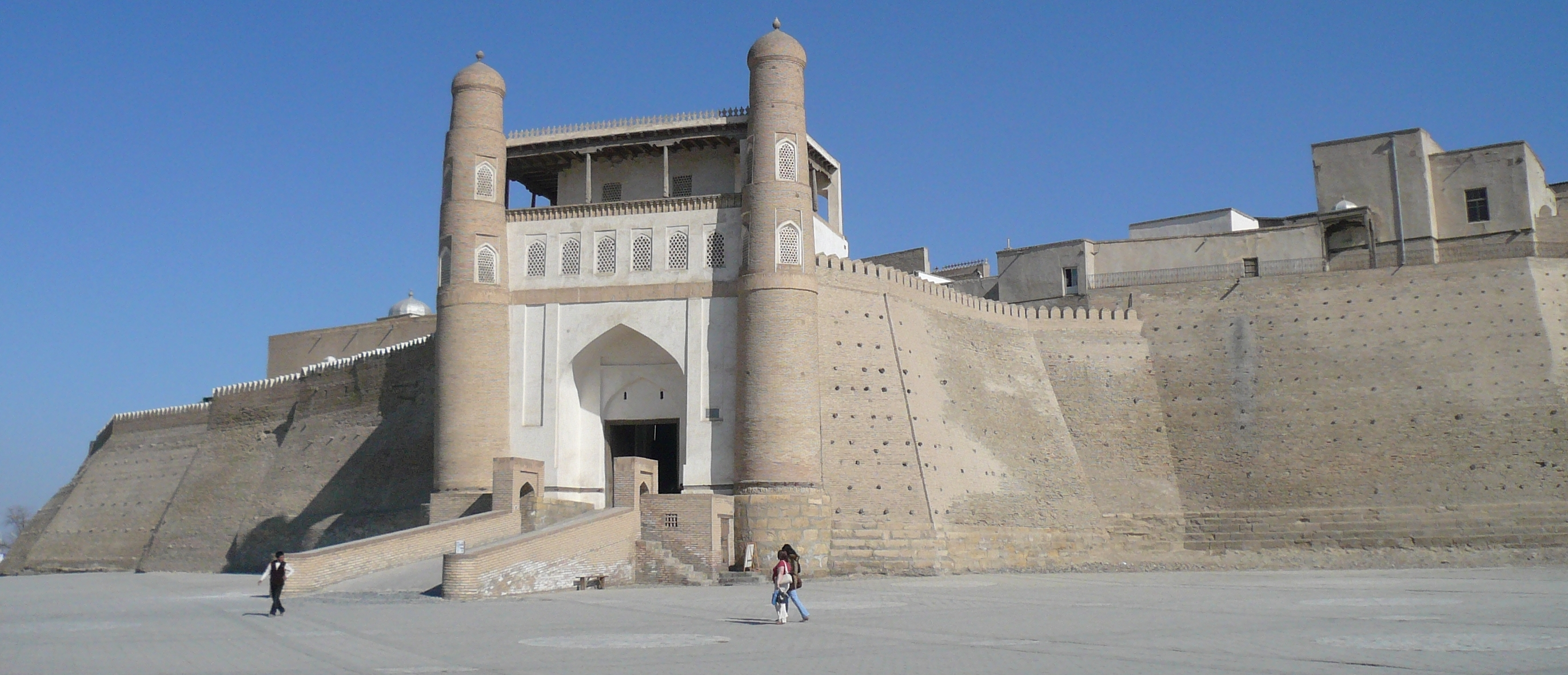
The Ark Fortress in Bukhara

In 1841, in an attempt to counter the growing penetration of Russia into Central Asia, Conolly unsuccessfully tried to persuade the various khanates there to put aside their differences. In November 1841 he was captured while on a rescue mission to free fellow British officer Lieutenant Colonel Charles Stoddart, held in Bukhara. The two were executed by the Emir of Bukhara, Nasrullah Khan, on 24 June 1842 on charges of spying for the British Empire. They were both beheaded in the square in front of the Ark of Bukhara. Arthur Conolly's elder brother, Lieutenant Henry Valentine Conolly, administrator of Malabar, was murdered in 1855 in Calicut (in present-day Kerala, South India).

== Legacy ==
In 1845, Rev Joseph Wolff, who had undertaken an expedition to discover the two officers' fate and barely escaped with his life, published an extensive account of his travels in Central Asia, which made Conolly and Stoddart household names in Britain for years to come.

Conolly's portrait by James Atkinson is in the British National Portrait Gallery. His 1840–1842 diaries as well as his letters and reports to Sir John Hobhouse and William Cabell are in the British Library; his 1839 letters to Viscount Ponsonby are in the Durham University Library.
