= Bukharan tenga =

The tenga (Persian: تنگه, romanized: tanga) was the currency of the Emirate of Bukhara until 1920. It was subdivided into 10 falus. It was replaced by the Russian ruble at a rate of 1 ruble = 5 tenga.

The name of the tenga is derived from the Sanskrit word tanka. All inscriptions on Bukharan tenga are written in Persian, and from 1787 verses from the Qur'an no longer appear on Bukharan coins. Tenga coins generally weigh 3.2 grams.
