= Shah Murad =

Emir of Bukhara from 1785 to 1799

- Amir al-Mu'minin; Amir Ma'sum

Emir of Bukhara
- Reign: 1785 – 1799
- Predecessor: Daniyal biy
- Successor: Amir Haydar
- Born: February 28, 1748; Bukhara
- Died: December 19, 1799 (aged 51); Bukhara
- Burial: Bukhara
Temple name
- Taizu (太祖)
- House: Manghit dynasty
- Father: Daniyal Biy
- Religion: Islam

Shah Murad (Chagatai and Persian: شاه مراد), also known as Beg-i Jan, alternatively titled Amir al-Mu'minin (lit. 'Commander of the Faithful'), Amir Ma'sum Ghazi or Padishah Ghazi in Bukharan historiography, was the first Amir of the Emirate of Bukhara from 1785 to his death in 1799. His father was Ataliq Daniyal Biy (1758–1785). After Daniyal Biy's death, Shah Murad came to power.

== Youth ==
Shah Murad was born in 1749 in Kermine into the family of a representative of the Uzbek aristocracy, Danial-Biy (1758-1785). He was the eldest of his eleven siblings. His mother was from the Uzbek Qongirat tribe. Shah Murad was the beloved son of his father, who affectionately called him Beg-i Jan. His political activity began during the life of Daniyal Biy. At first, he was the governor of Kermine but later was appointed as governor in Qarshi. From his youth, Shah Murad was inclined towards Sufism and spent his days in khanaqahs and mosques praying. He declined the wealth inherited from his father and wanted it distributed among the common folk. He introduced Islamic laws into the Bukharan administration.

== Urban development ==
In 1780-1781, he was appointed the ruler of Samarkand and made a lot of efforts to restore the city. Amir Shah Murad drew the history of reconstruction of Samarkand. He built 24 districts in the city and moved many families here from the eastern regions of the country. As a result, the city became more crowded, and the economic and cultural situation was much improved. Currently, one of the streets of Samarkand is named after Shah Murad. For his modest lifestyle, the people called him Amir Ma'sum, which meant a sinless emir. Amir Shahmurad built the city of Islamabad near Marv.

== Political life ==
In 1785, he launched a campaign against the Qajar Principality of Merv, intending to use it as a base for raids against Iran. He killed the governor, Bayram 'Ali Khan Qajar, and fully conquered the region in 1788.

Shah Murad abolished the luxurious courtyard, and instead established a courtroom, where forty judges sat under his direct supervision. According to some reports, the court was in session on Mondays and Fridays. Each judge had books written by Shah Murad in his hands. It can be assumed that these were books on jurisprudence. Shah Murad's works have not survived to this day. Any one, regardless of his political and economic status, had the right to come to the courtroom if he was summoned there. There were both high officials and slaves. Thus, Shah Murad carried out judicial reform.

According to Malcolm, the universal reverence of Shah Murad by the Uzbeks allowed him to make a number of successful campaigns. His army consisted mainly of cavalry, with whose help he subdued all the separatist possessions. Shah Murad himself stood at the head of the army during his campaigns and was dressed in the poor clothes of a representative of the religious class.

Historian Ahmad Donish (1827-1897) suggested periodizing the history of Central Asia on the basis of the rule of the most prominent rulers, the so-called renovators of the century, among whom he included Amir Ma'sum, that is, Shah Murad. At the same time, along with these renovators, there were also the most knowledgeable scientists who advanced in the states of Maverannahr. Shah Murad maintained diplomatic relations with the Ottoman Empire and the Russian Empire.

Shah Murad died in December 1799 and was succeeded by Haydar bin Shah Murad.

== Literature ==
- Akhmad Donish, Puteshestviye iz Bukhary Peterburg. Dushanbe, 1960.
- Holzwarth, Wolfgang. "Community Elders and State Agents: Īlbēgīs in the Emirate of Bukhara around 1900." Eurasian Studies (2011).
- Holzwarth, Wolfgang. "The Uzbek State as reflected in eighteenth-century Bukharan sources." Asiatische Studien 60, no. 2 (2006): 321–353.

Preceded by Daniyal biy	Emir of Bukhara; 1785–1799	Succeeded by Haydar bin Shahmurad
