= Sayyid Mir Muhammad Alim Khan =

Emir of Bukhara from 1911 to 1920

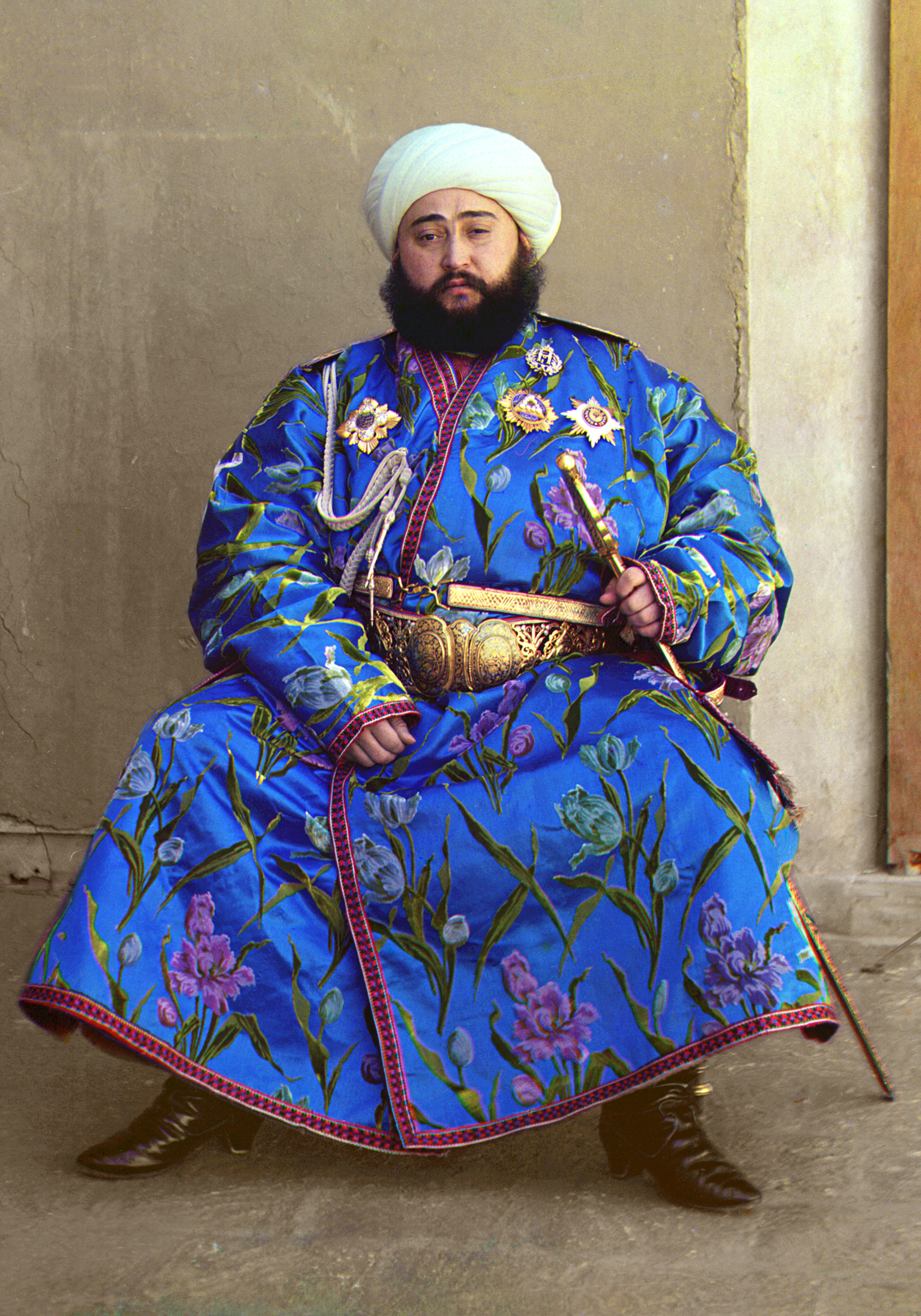
- Alim Khan, photographed in color by Prokudin-Gorsky in 1911 (remastered digitally in 2000)

Emir of Bukhara
- Reign: 3 January 1911 – 30 August 1920
- Predecessor: 'Abd al-Ahad Khan
- Successor: Monarchy abolished
- Born: 3 January 1880; Bukhara, Emirate of Bukhara (present-day Uzbekistan)
- Died: 28 April 1944 (aged 64); Kabul, Afghanistan
- Spouses: 3
- Issue: Sultanmurad; Shahmurad; Rakhimkhan; Shukria Alimi Raad
- House: Borjigin
- Dynasty: Manghud
- Father: 'Abd al-Ahad Khan
- Religion: Sunni Islam

Emir Sayyid Mir Muhammad Alim Khan (Chagatai and Persian: سید میر محمد عالم خان, 3 January 1880 – 28 April 1944) was the last emir of the Uzbek Manghit dynasty, rulers of the Emirate of Bukhara in Central Asia. Although Bukhara was a protectorate of the Russian Empire from 1873, the Emir presided over the internal affairs of his emirate as an absolute monarch and reigned from 3 January 1911 to 30 August 1920.

== Early life ==
At the age of thirteen, Alim Khan was sent by his father Emir Abdulahad Khan to Saint Petersburg for three years to study government and modern military techniques. In 1896, having received formal confirmation as Crown Prince of Bukhara by the Russian government, he returned home.

After two years in Bukhara assisting in his father's administration, he was appointed governor of the Nasef region for the next twelve years. He was then transferred to the northern province of Karmana, which he ruled for another two years, until receiving word in 1910 of his father's death.

== Reign ==
At the beginning of Alim Khan's rule, there were promising signs of reform. He initially announced a rejection of personal gifts and prohibited officials from soliciting bribes or imposing unauthorized taxes. However, over time, there was a shift in the Emir's approach to issues like bribes, taxes, and state salaries. The power struggle between traditionalists and reformists concluded with the traditionalists gaining control, and the reformist faction finding refuge in Moscow or Kazan. Some historians suggest that Alim Khan, who initially supported modernization and reforms, may have realized that the reformists' ultimate objectives excluded him and his descendants from future rule. Like his predecessors, Alim Khan was a traditional ruler. He toyed with the idea of reform as a tool to keep the clergy in line, but only as long as he saw the possibility of using it to strengthen Manghud rule.

One of the most important Tajik writers, Sadriddin Ayniy, wrote vivid accounts of life under the Emir. He was whipped for speaking Tajik and later wrote about the life under the Emirs in The Bukhara Executioners ("Jallodon-i Bukhara").

Alim Khan was the only Manghud ruler to add the title of Caliph to his name, and was the last direct descendant of the Manghit dynasty to serve as a national ruler. In 1914-1916 - Nodir Devonbegi Khanaka was repaired by Olim Khan.

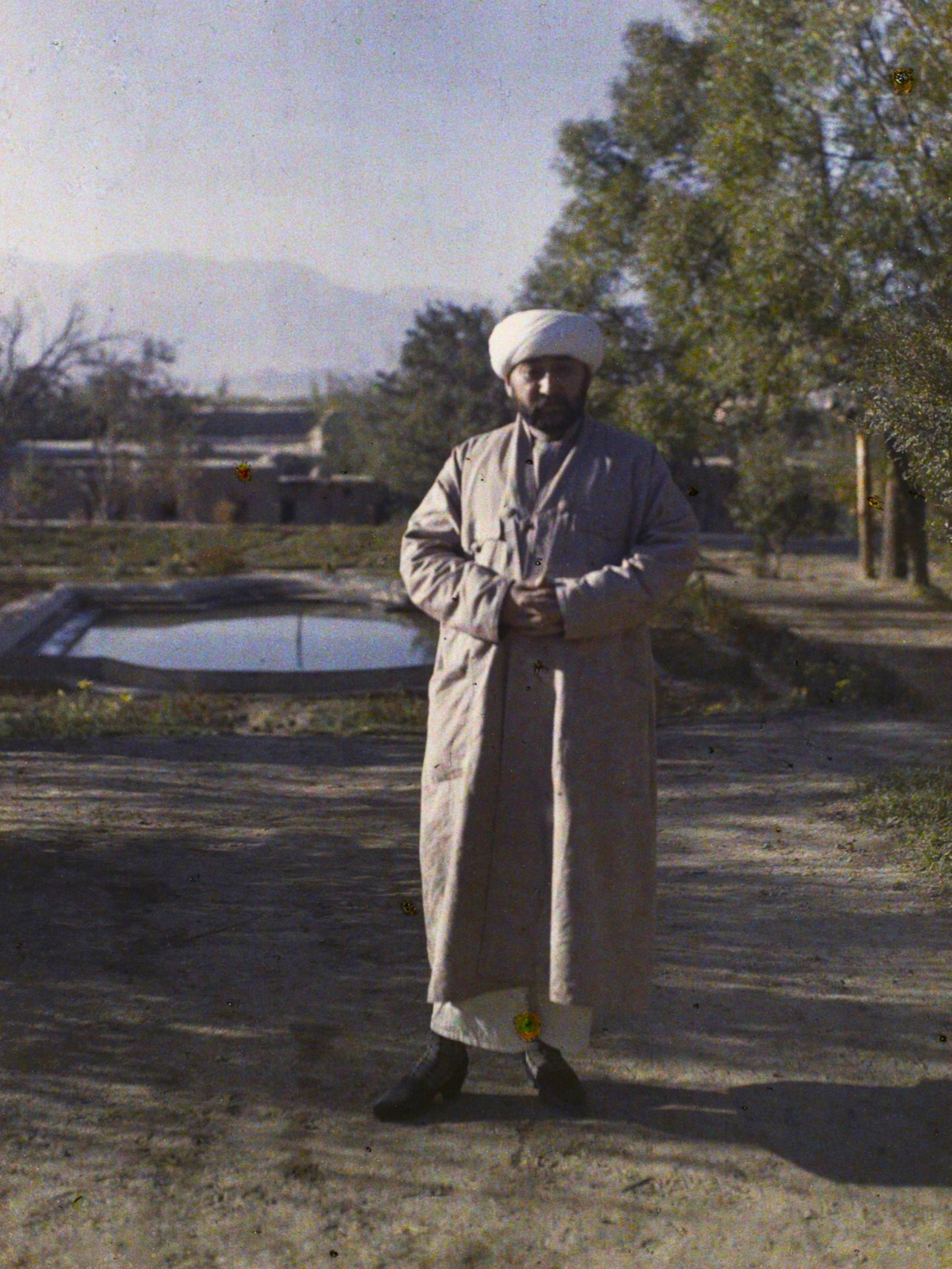
Autochrome of Alim Khan during exile in Afghanistan, taken by Frédéric Gadmer in 1928

In March 1918, activists of the Young Bukharan Movement (Yosh Buxoroliklar) informed the Bolsheviks that the Bukharians were ready for the revolution and that the people were awaiting liberation. The Red Army marched to the gates of Bukhara and demanded that the emir surrender the city to the Young Bukharans. As Russian sources report, the emir responded by killing the Bolshevik delegation, along with several hundred Russian supporters of the Bolsheviks in Bukhara and the surrounding territories. The majority of Bukharans did not support an invasion and the ill-equipped and ill-disciplined Bolshevik army fled back to the Soviet stronghold at Tashkent.

== Deposition and death ==
However, the emir had won only a temporary respite. As the civil war in Russia wound down, Moscow sent reinforcements to Central Asia. On 2 September 1920, an army of well-disciplined and well-equipped Red Army troops, under the command of general Mikhail Frunze, attacked the city. After four days of fighting, the Ark of Bukhara was destroyed, the red flag was raised from the top of Kalyan Minaret, and the Emir Alim Khan fled, first to his base at Dushanbe (in present-day Tajikistan), and then finally to Kabul, Afghanistan, where he died in 1944. He is buried at the Shuadoi Solehin cemetery.

He was awarded the Montenegran Order of Prince Danilo I and a number of other decorations.

== Family ==
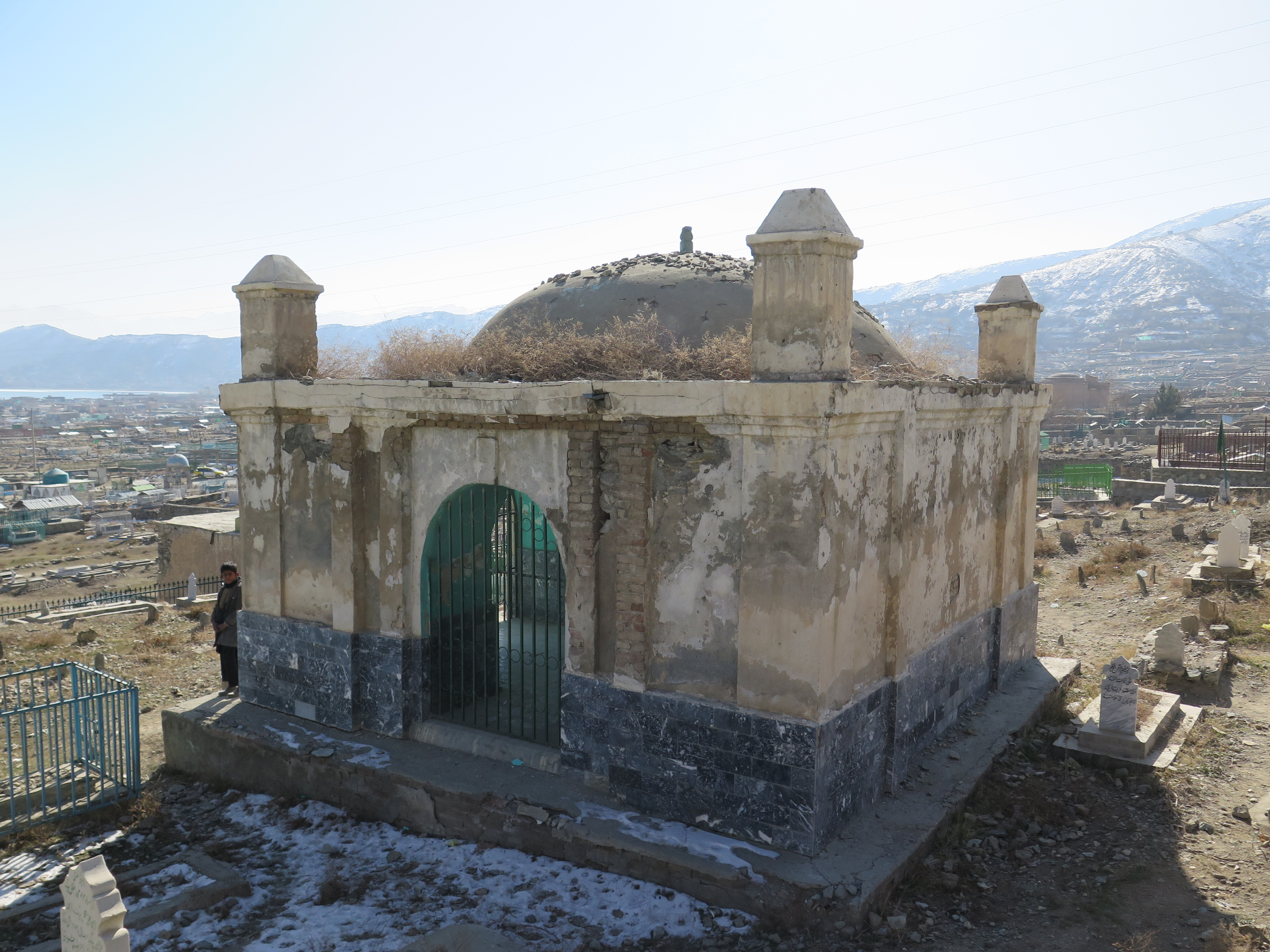
Said Mir Mohammed Alim Khan mausoleum, Kabul, Afghanistan

Although the emir had several children, the exact number of offspring the emir had is unknown. Emir Alim Khan had three official wives in Bukhara, but after settling in Afghanistan, people there sympathized with him and many gave their daughters to him as wives. Therefore, he had several more wives in Afghanistan. According to some estimates, Seyid Alim Khan's offspring numbered about 500. With the exception of only a few, almost all of his descendants were with him during the last years of his life.

By the end of August 1920, the Red Army was surrounding and had begun to bombard Bukhara. Seyid Alim Khan hastily began to evacuate himself, his family, and some of his close associates. However, possibly due to the suddenness of the forced evacuation, his three young sons—about 8–10 years old (according to other sources, 4–6 years old), Sultanmurad, Shahmurad and Rahimkhan—remained in Bukhara. After the capture of Bukhara, the Bolsheviks discovered them and at first wanted to shoot them together with the remaining several members of the family and close associates of the emir (similar to the execution of Nicholas II with his family and close associates), but left them alive in order to further propaganda in their favor, sending all three to Moscow to be raised in an orphanage for the orphans of dead Bolsheviks and soldiers of the Red Army.

Seyid Alim Khan appealed to the Bolsheviks and the world community for the release of his children and other family members who had remained in Bukhara, to join him in Afghanistan, but the Bolsheviks refused, keeping them as hostages for personal, political, and ideological purposes. The eldest of these three sons of Seyid Alim Khan, Sultanmurad, was disabled and lame from birth. He graduated from the Faculty of Workers and after his studies began working at a factory for the disabled. According to some reports, he spoke English. Some time later, Sultanmurad was arrested by the NKVD and declared an "enemy of the people". Among other charges, he was accused of collaborating with British intelligence. After his arrest, Sultanmurad announced a hunger strike and soon died, most likely from exhaustion. His wife at that time worked at a soap factory and, according to some reports, upon learning of the death of her husband, threw herself into a cauldron of boiling soap.

Before the outbreak of World War II, during the "Great Terror", the youngest of these sons of Seyid Alim Khan, Rahimkhan, who remained in the USSR, tried to flee the country, but was detained by Soviet border guards on the Soviet-Afghan border. According to some sources, he was detained in the territory of the Uzbek SSR, on the Amu Darya River, which separated the USSR and Afghanistan; according to other sources, he was detained in the territory of the Turkmen SSR, where the border between the USSR and Afghanistan runs through the steppes and hills. After that, a sentence of execution was read to him, and he was shot by the NKVD.

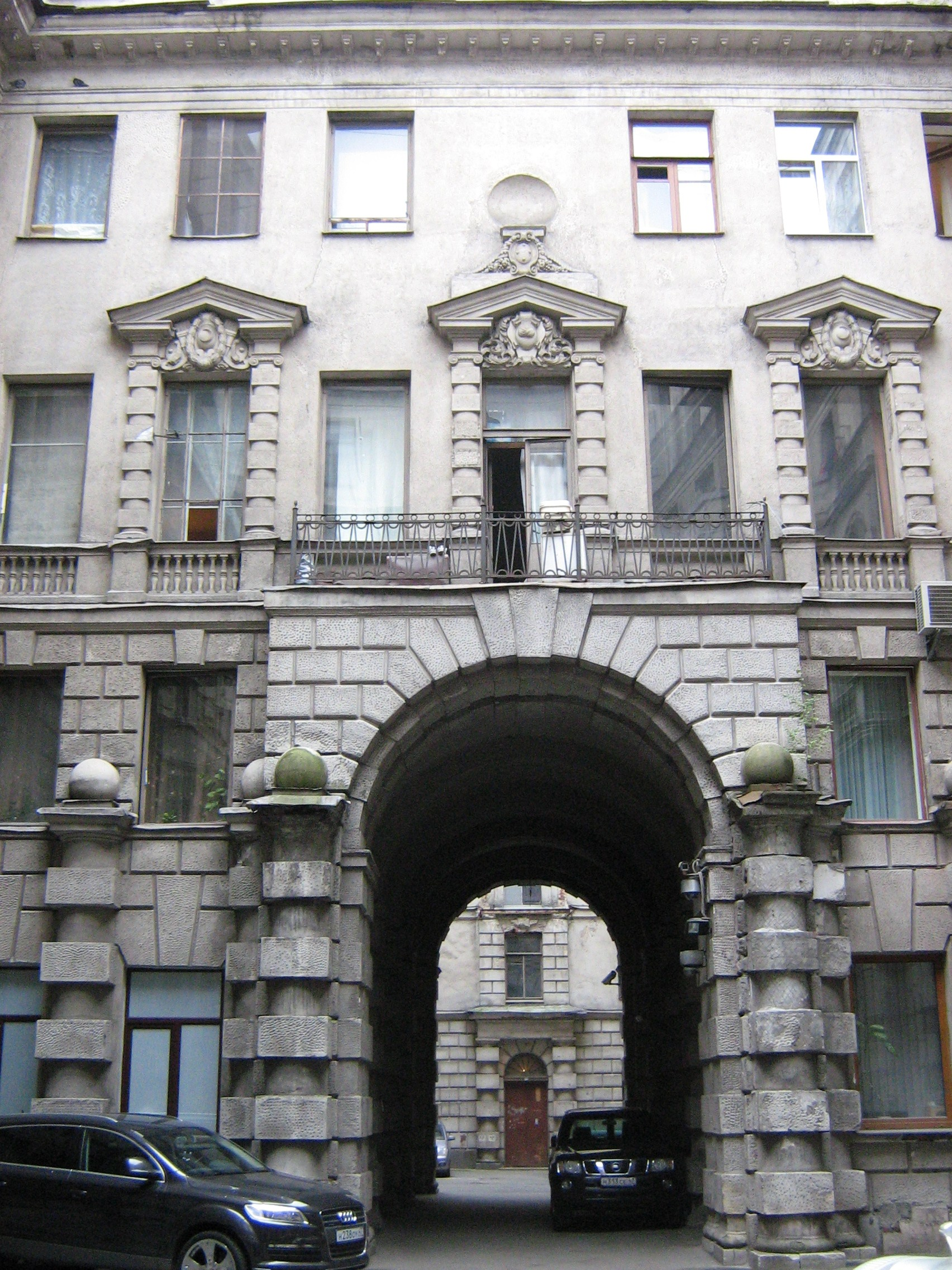
Alim Khan's house in Saint Petersburg

The middle of the three, Shahmurad, was also with his brothers in a Moscow orphanage, but in 1922, together with several Bukhara youths, was sent by the authorities of the Bukhara People's Soviet Republic to study in Germany as part of the training of new young personnel for the young republic. Due to ideological considerations, he was given a new full name - "Alimov Shah Muratovich" (according to other sources, his full name was "Shakhmurad Alimkhanov"). After returning from studies, he was fluent in German. He also studied at the Institute of the Coal Industry. According to Shahmurad's classmate, Khaidar Yusupov, Shahmurad dreamed of becoming a military man, but could not be admitted to study at a military school due to ideological considerations, as he was "the son of an enemy of the people." After that, on the advice of friends and acquaintances, he decided to disown his father. In 1930 (according to other sources, in 1929) he wrote an open letter to his father through the Izvestia newspaper, where he renounced Seyid Alim Khan, accusing him and his government of grave sins and deeds. According to some reports, this was arranged by the NKVD, which pushed him to take such a step through acquaintances and friends who were NKVD informants. Subsequently, he was admitted to the V. V. Kuibyshev Military Engineering Academy in Moscow, and then taught there upon graduation. He later served in the Red Army, achieving the rank of major general, and participated in World War II, when he lost a leg. He was awarded the Order of the Red Banner and, after the end of the war, again began teaching at the V. V. Kuibyshev Military Engineering Academy in Moscow, then married Lidia Mikhailovna. According to the memoirs of one of Shakhmurad's contemporaries, "when Shahmurad came to visit us with his wife Lidia Mikhailovna, he became drunk, remembered his parents, and cried." Many of Shahmurad's acquaintances and friends did not know of his origin, and he spoke about his past only to close friends. According to some reports, he died in 1985 in Moscow, at the age of 75.

Alim Khan's daughter, Shukria Alimi Raad, worked as a broadcaster for Radio Afghanistan. Shukria Raad left Afghanistan with her family three months after Soviet troops invaded the country in December 1979. With her husband, also a journalist, and two children, she fled to Pakistan, and then through Germany to the United States. In 1982, she joined the Voice of America, working for many years as a broadcaster for VOA's Dari Service, editor, program host and producer.

During his governance in Bukhara, Alim Khan also had a son named Qasem, who was killed by the Bolshevik revolutionaries. Qasem had only one son who, when he was 13 years old, escaped from Bukhara to Mashhad, Iran, with his stepfather. When he arrived in Iran, he took the name Husein Bukharaei. He married Bibimeymanat Mohsenolhoseini in Mashhad. They had 6 sons and 4 daughters. Husein Bukharaei died in 1993. Their children live in Mashhad.

In 2020, the BBC World Service made a documentary, called Bukhara, which discusses Emir Alim Khan and the fate of his family.

Alim Khan's descendants include his granddaughter Nailaj Naebzadeh from his daughter Razia Alimi; his great-granddaughter Kadeij Naebzadeh; They also include Nailaj Naebzadeh, who was born in United States. Just like her aunt, Shukria Alimi Raad, her mother Razia Alimi also escaped from Afghanistan during the invasion of the Soviet Army in 1979.

Regnal titles
Preceded by 'Abd al-Ahad Khan	Emir of Bukhara; 1911–1920	Monarchy abolished
