= Mir Hussein bin Haydar =

Emir of Bukhara in 1826

Emir of Bukhara
- Reign: October 1826 – December 1826
- Predecessor: Haydar bin Shahmurad
- Successor: Umar bin Haydar
- Born: 1797; Bukhara
- Died: 1826 (aged 28–29); Bukhara
- Burial: Bukhara
- House: Manghit dynasty
- Father: Haydar bin Shahmurad
- Religion: Islam

Mir Hussein bin Haydar (Chagatai and Persian: میر حسین بن حیدر; c. 1797–1826) was the Uzbek Emir of Bukharan Emirate from October to December 1826. His father was emir Haydar bin Shahmurad (1800–1826). Emir Haydar died in October 1826 and was succeeded by his son Mir Hussein bin Haydar.

Hussein ruled for only two months and fourteen days. According to local historian Ahmad Donish, “this emir has achieved extraordinary perfection and merit, he mastered all sciences, including foreign ones. He knew versification, medicine, alchemy and fortune telling".

== Death ==
Mir Hussein reigned for only two months and fourteen days (October–December 1826). According to some reports, he was poisoned by Hakim Kushbegi. Emir Mir Hussein died in December 1826 and was succeeded by Umar bin Haydar.

== Literature ==
- Akhmad Donish, Puteshestviye iz Bukhary Peterburg. Dushanbe, 1960.
- Holzwarth, Wolfgang. "Community Elders and State Agents: Īlbēgīs in the Emirate of Bukhara around 1900." Eurasian Studies (2011).
- Bregel, Y. (2009). The new Uzbek states: Bukhara, Khiva and Khoqand: C. 1750–1886. In N. Di Cosmo, A. Frank, & P. Golden (Eds.), The Cambridge History of Inner Asia: The Chinggisid Age (pp. 392-411). Cambridge: Cambridge University Press

Preceded by Haydar bin Shahmurad	Emir of Bukhara; 1826	Succeeded by Umar bin Haydar
