= Ahmad Donish =

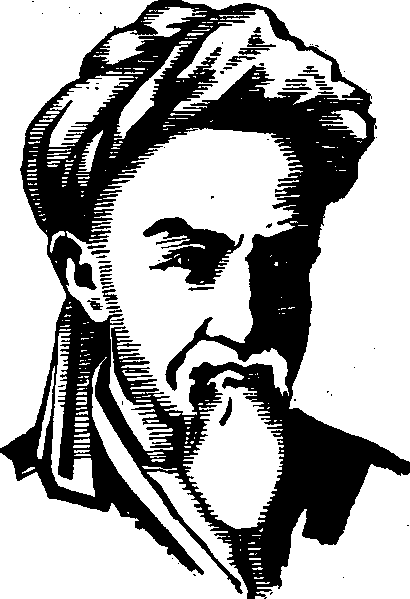
- Modern illustration of Ahmad Donish
- Born: 1827; Bukhara, Emirate of Bukhara
- Died: 1897 (aged 69–70); Bukhara, Emirate of Bukhara
- Occupations: Writer, historian
- Writing career
- Language: Persian

Ahmad Donish (also spelled Danish: 1827–1897) was a writer, reformer, historian and poet in the Emirate of Bukhara.

== Biography ==
Donish was a Tajik and native of Bukhara, the capital of the Emirate of Bukhara. Despite being the son of a imam, he found street stories more engaging than his study of the Quran. While attending a madrasa, he taught himself astronomy, calligraphy, geometry, medicine, history, literature, and music. He subsequently became a pupil of the court architect, who was interested in his artistic abilities. In c. 1850 he became a painter and calligrapher of the Bukharan emir Nasrullah Khan (r. 1827–1860). He later rose to the position of court astronomer and acted as a mediator between the clergy and the emir.

Nasrullah Khan and his successor Muzaffar bin Nasrullah (r. 1860–1885) wanted to utilize Donish's skills while keeping him out of the court, despite his unpopularity as a freethinker at the Bukharan court. As a result, in November 1857, October 1869, and January 1874, he was dispatched to Saint Petersburg three times as a secretary of the Bukharan embassy.

== Sources ==
- Foltz, Richard (2019). A History of the Tajiks: Iranians of the East. New York: Bloomsbury Publishing. ISBN 978-1784539559.
- Fourniau, Vincent (1993). "Dāneš, Aḥmad Maḵdūm". In Yarshater, Ehsan (ed.). Encyclopædia Iranica (Online ed.). Encyclopædia Iranica Foundation. ISBN 978-0710090959.
- Wilde, Andreas (2020). "Manghit dynasty". In Fleet, Kate; Krämer, Gudrun; Matringe, Denis; Nawas, John; Rowson, Everett (eds.). Encyclopaedia of Islam (3rd ed.). Brill Online. ISSN 1873-9830.
