= Emirate of Bukhara =

1785–1920 state in Central Asia

Emirate of Bukhara امارت بخارا (Persian) بخارا امیرلیگی (Chagatay)
- 1785–1920
- Bukhara National Flag as published in 1929 by deposed Emir in exile Sayyid Alim Khan.

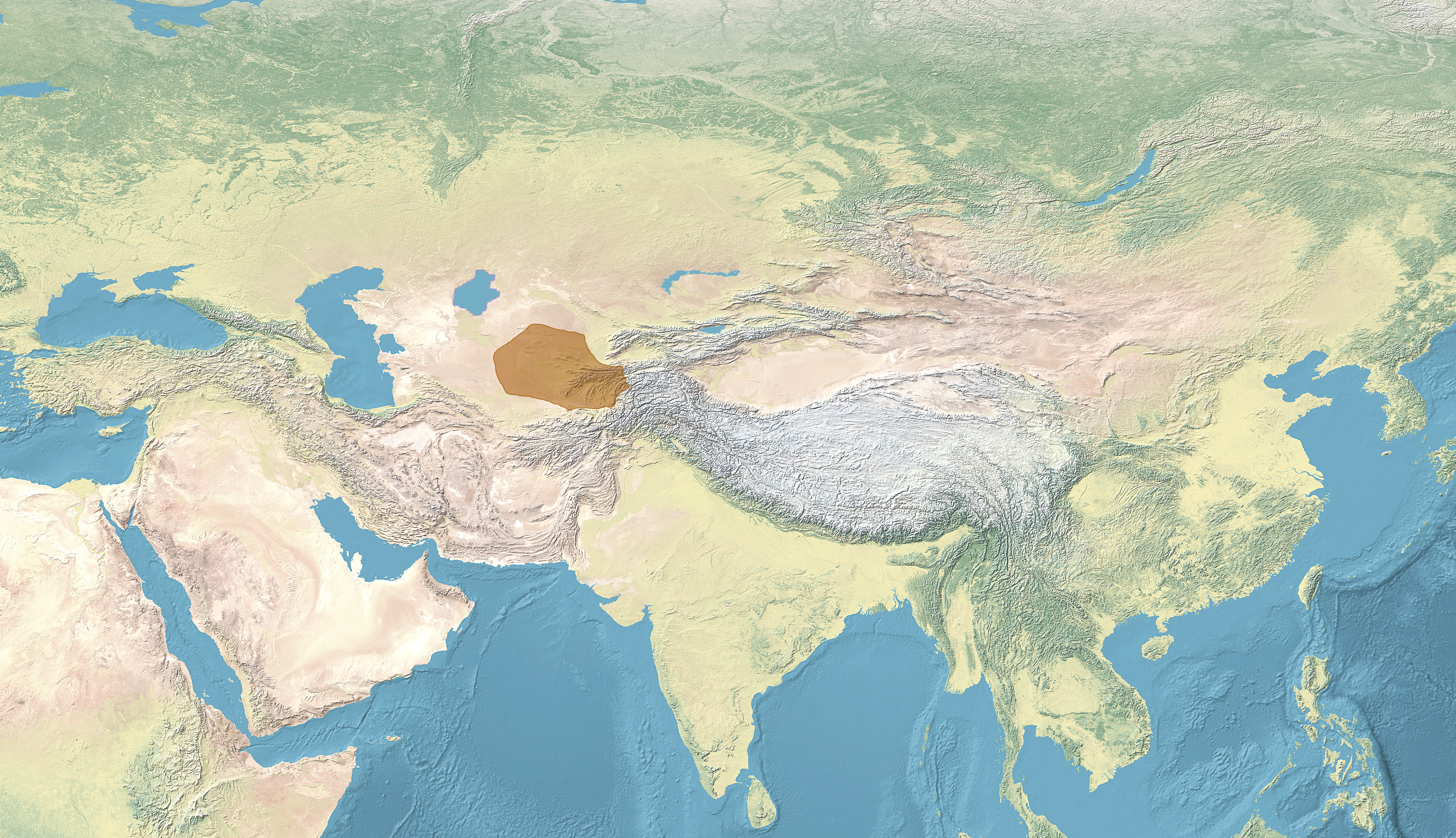
- The Emirate of Bukhara and main polities in Asia c. 1800
- Status: Independent emirate (1785–1873); Quasi-independent Russian protectorate (1873–1920)
- Capital and largest city: Bukhara
- Common languages: Persian (official, court, literature, administration); Chagatai Turkic (dynastic)
- Religion: Sunni Islam (official), Sufism (Naqshbandi)
- Government: Absolute monarchy
- Emir
  - 1785–1799: Mir Masum Shah Murad
  - 1911–1920: Mir Muhammad Alim Khan
- History
  - Manghit control: 1747
  - Shah Murad became Emir: 1785
  - Conquered by Russia: 1868
  - Russian protectorate: 1873
  - Fall of Bukhara: 2 September 1920

Population
  - 1875: c. 2,478,000
  - 1911: c. 3,000,000–3,500,000
- Currency: Fulus, tilla, and tenga
Preceded by	Succeeded by
Khanate of Bukhara	Bukharan People's Soviet Republic

The Emirate of Bukhara (Note: Persian: امارت بخارا, romanized: Imārat-i Buxārā, pronounced [ʔimaːˈrati buxaːˈraː]; Chagatay: بخارا امیرلیگی, romanized: Buxārā Amirligi, pronounced [buχɑːˈɾɑː ɑˌmiɾliˈgi]; Uzbek: Buxoro amirligi, arabized: بخارا امیرلیگی, pronounced [bʊχɒˈrɒ ɐˌmɪrlɪˈgɪ̆]; Tajik: Иморати Бухоро, romanized: Imorati Buxoro, arabized: امارت بخارا, pronounced [ɪmɔˈratɪ bʊχɔˈrɔ]) was an Uzbek absolute monarchy in Central Asia that existed from 1785 to 1920 in what is now parts of Tajikistan, Uzbekistan, Turkmenistan and Kazakhstan. It occupied the land between the Amu Darya and Syr Darya rivers, known formerly as Transoxiana. Its core territory was the fertile land along the lower Zarafshon river, and its urban centres were the ancient cities of Samarqand and the emirate's capital, Bukhara. It was contemporaneous with the Khanate of Khiva to the west, in Khwarazm, and the Khanate of Kokand to the east, in Fergana. In 1920, it ceased to exist with the establishment of the Bukharan People's Soviet Republic. The Turco-Mongol tribe of Uzbeks known as "Manghits" were the rulers.

== Name ==
Local historiography did not refer to the realm as Emirate of Bukhara. Instead, it commonly referred to it as Māvarā’ al-nahr (Persian and Arabic: ما وراء النهر, lit. 'what is beyond the [‌Amu Darya / Oxus] river', Transoxiana), a long-standing name used for the region between Amu Darya and Syr Darya. Turan or Turkistan was also occasionally used, in contrast to the region south of the Amu Darya, which was called Iran or Khorasan (Persian: خراسان). The name vilāyat-i Bukhārā (ولایت بخارا, 'Dominion of Bukhara') was also sometimes used. In the 18th and 19th centuries, contradictory accounts of the realm's general layout were given by Bukharan court historians. Authors frequently differed in their accounts of both the number and names of the provinces, regions, and lands comprising the realm.

== History ==
The Emirate of Bukhara was officially created in 1785, upon the assumption of rulership by the Manghit emir, Shah Murad. Shahmurad, formalized the family's dynastic rule (Manghit dynasty), and the khanate became the Emirate of Bukhara.

As one of the few states in Central Asia after the Mongol Empire not ruled by descendants of Genghis Khan (besides the Timurids), it staked its legitimacy on Islamic principles rather than Genghisid blood, as the ruler took the Islamic title of Emir instead of Khan. In the 18th and 19th centuries, Khwarazm (Khiva Khanate) was ruled by the Uzbek dynasty of Kungrats.

Over the course of the 18th century, the emirs had slowly gained effective control of the Khanate of Bukhara, from their position as ataliq; and by the 1740s, when the khanate was conquered by Nadir Shah of Persia, it was clear that the emirs held the real power. In 1747, after Nadir Shah's death, the ataliq Muhammad Rahim Bi murdered Abulfayz Khan and his son, ending the Janid dynasty. From then on the emirs allowed puppet khans to rule until, following the death of Abu l-Ghazi Khan, Shah Murad assumed the throne openly.

Fitzroy Maclean recounts in Eastern Approaches how Charles Stoddart and Arthur Conolly were executed by Nasrullah Khan in the context of The Great Game, and how Joseph Wolff, known as the Eccentric Missionary, escaped their fate when he came looking for them in 1845. He was wearing his full canonical costume, which caused the Emir to burst out laughing, and "Dr Wolff was eventually forced to leave Bokhara, greatly to the surprise of the populace, who were not accustomed to such clemency."

In 1868, the emirate lost a war with Imperial Russia, which had aspirations of conquest in the region. Russia annexed much of the emirate's territory, including the important city of Samarkand. In 1873, the remainder became a Russian protectorate, and was soon surrounded by the Governorate-General of Turkestan. The Russians forced the abolition of the Bukhara slave trade in 1873, though slavery itself was not formally abolished until 1885.

Reformists within the Emirate had found the conservative emir, Mohammed Alim Khan, unwilling to loosen his grip on power, and had turned to the Russian Bolshevik revolutionaries for military assistance. The Red Army launched an unsuccessful assault in March 1920, and then a successful one in September of the same year. The Emirate of Bukhara was conquered by the Bolsheviks and replaced with the Bukharan People's Soviet Republic. Today, the territory of the defunct emirate lies mostly in Uzbekistan, with parts in Tajikistan, Turkmenistan and Kazakhstan. In the first half of the 19th century it had some influence in northern Afghanistan, as the emirs of the Chahar Wilayat (Maimana, Sheberghan, Andkhui, Sar-i Pol) nominally accepted Bukharan suzerainty.

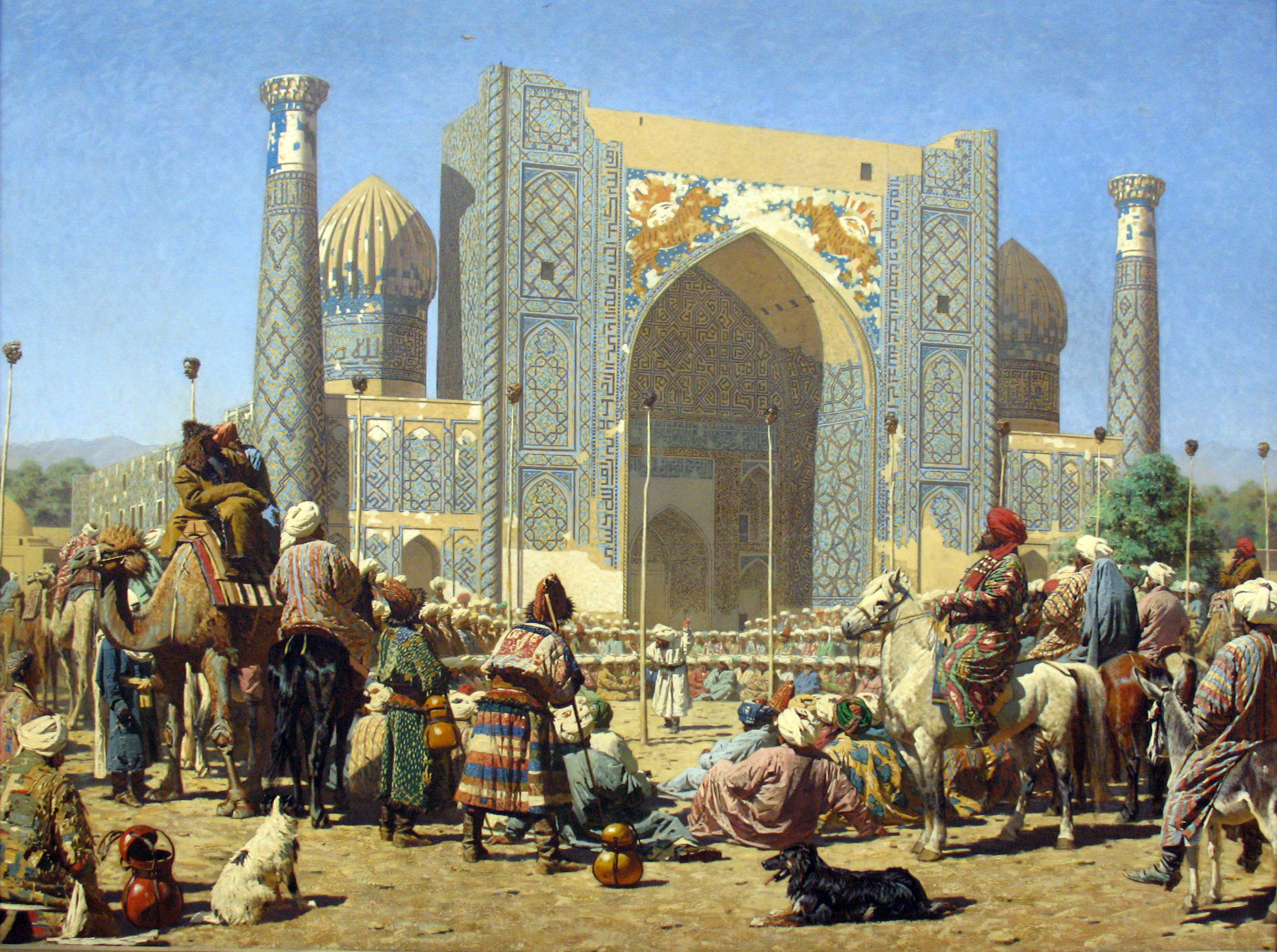
The Emir of Bukhara and the notables of the city watch how the heads of Russian soldiers are impaled on poles. Samarkand

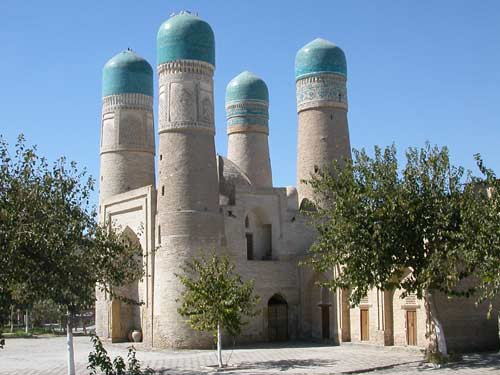
Chor Minor Madrasah, Bukhara (built in 1807)

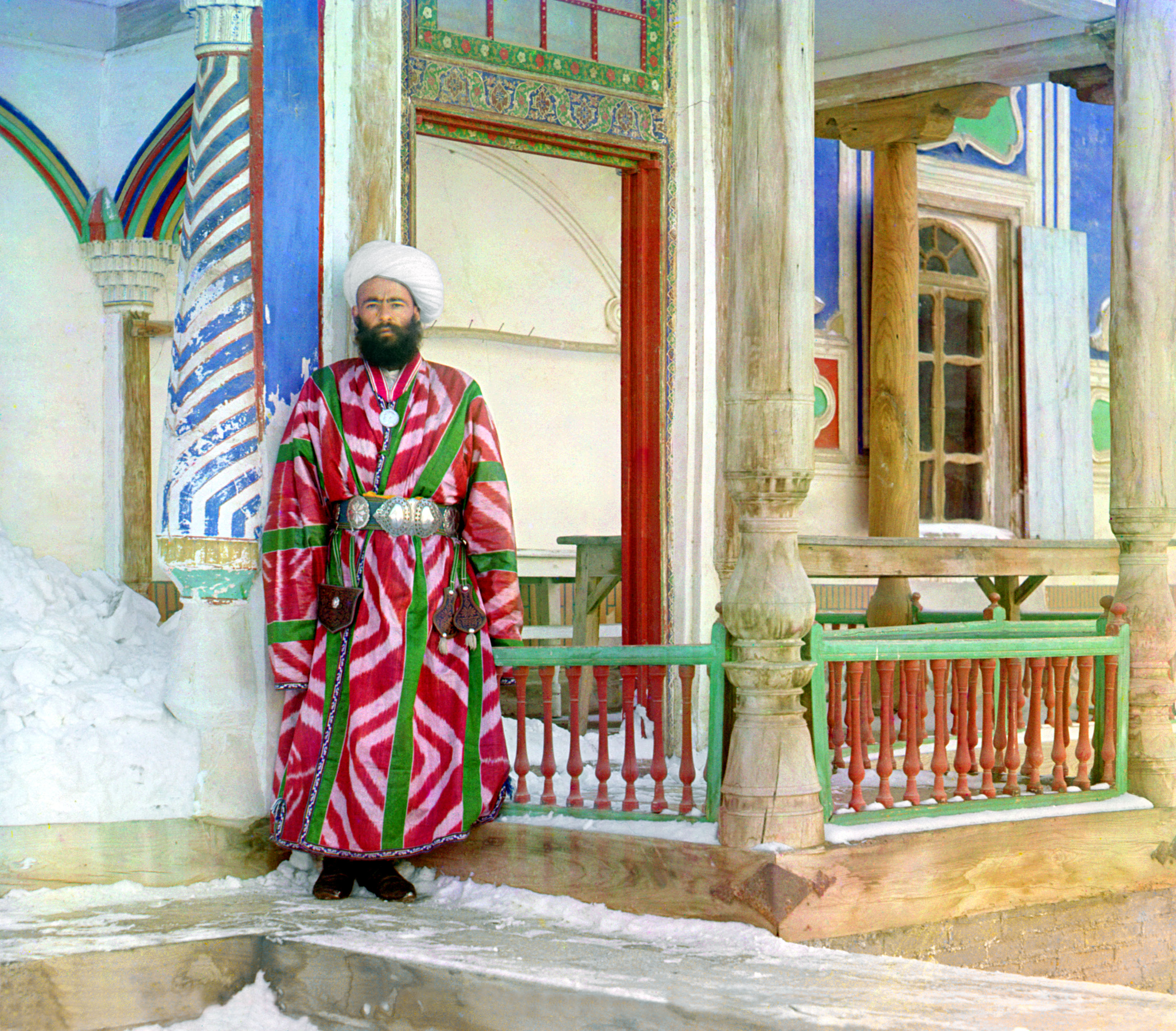
A bureaucrat in Bukhara, c. 1910

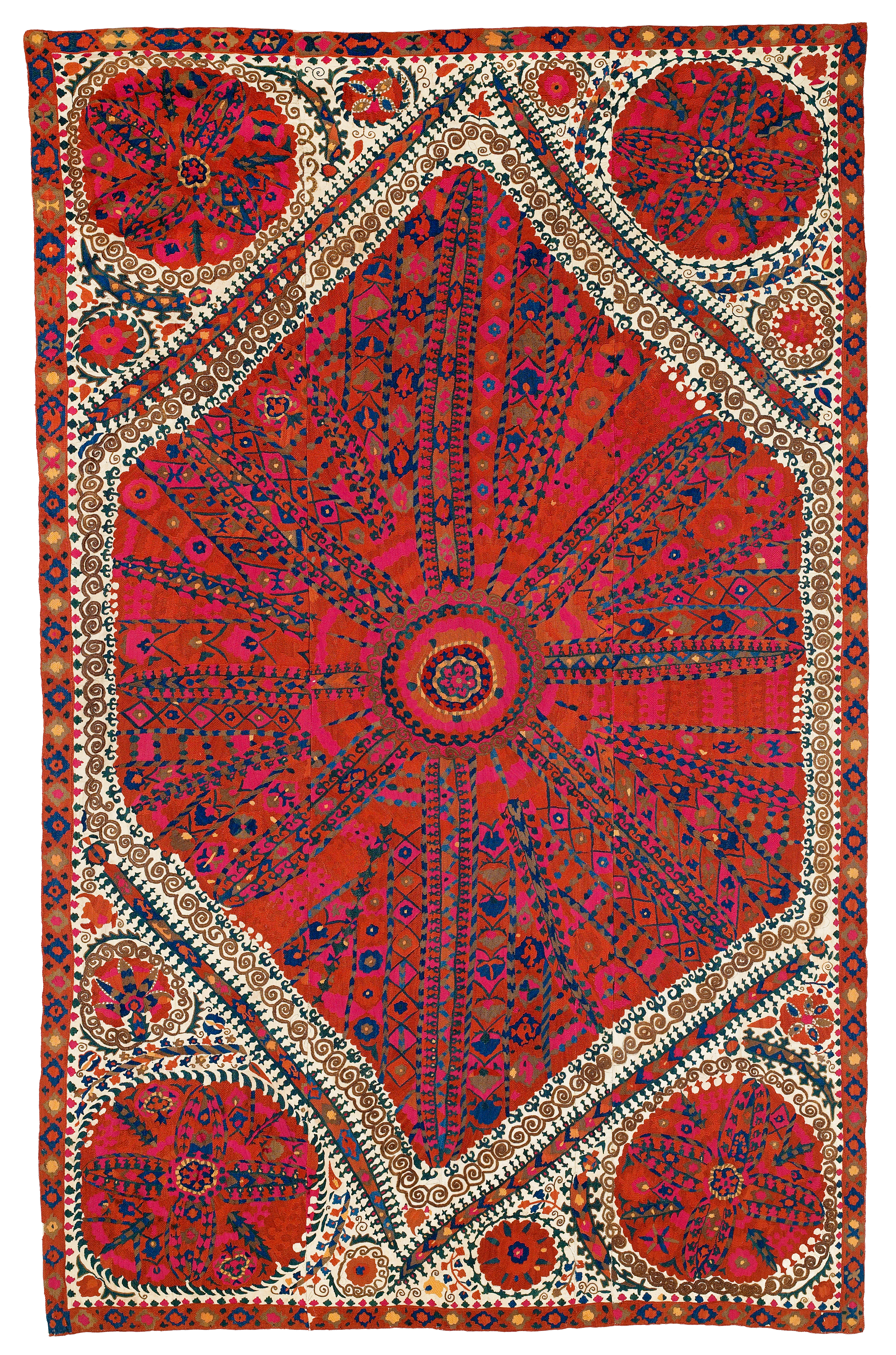
Large Medallion Suzani (textile) from Bukhara, c. mid-18th century

== Society ==
=== Population and religion ===
Population estimates for Bukhara in the 19th century vary throughout authors. According to the Russian diplomat and orientalist Nikolay Vladimirovich Khanykov, the population was between 2.0–2.5 million. Another author estimates the population to have been around 3 million in the early 20th century. The Hanafi school of Sunni Islam was the most dominant belief amongst Bukharans. Sufi brotherhoods were popular, particularly the many sects of the Naqshbandi Order (Juybaris, Dahbidis, Ahraris). A large minority also followed the Twelver school of Shia Islam, mostly people from Iran who were slaves, former slaves, or their descendants. The eastern Pamir Mountains, under Bukharan rule from the late 19th century, were inhabited by followers of Ismailism. Bukharan Jews also lived in the emirate, mostly in Bukhara and Samarqand. There was also a small Hindu diaspora.

=== Ethnic groups and identity ===
The people of the Bukharan emirate were bilingual and often ethnically mixed. Sedentary and nomadic lifestyles sharply contrasted, reflecting the varied geography, which included deserts, steppes, mountains, urban centers, and oases. The phrase turk wa tājik ("Turk and Tajik") expressed this separation by representing the two primary elements of the society. The first element was the tribal nomadic clans of Turkic and Turco-Mongol heritage (Uzbek, Turkmen, Kazakh, Karakalpak, etc) that made up the military and ruling class. The second element were the peasants and townspeople who spoke Persian and Chagatai. Nomads and the settled population were rarely in conflict despite their notable socioeconomic differences.

The idea of tying a region to a certain ethnic or language group was unfamiliar to the Muslims of Central Asia. At that time, while terms such as Uzbek, Tajik, and Kyrgyz were recognized, they did not adequately describe the overlapping and shifting identities of the population. For these people, allegiances based on tribal, clan, local, or family ties were more significant than those based solely on ethnicity, since they had long intermixed. Due to years of interaction between Turks and Tajiks, the urban population of Central Asian cities developed a unique mixed identity, making it difficult to determine which linguistic community an urban inhabitant belonged to, since bilingualism was widespread. This is demonstrated in the bayaz, private journals wrapped in leather from the 16th to 19th centuries, where verses in both languages often appeared together. Unlike grandiose manuscripts made for the elite, these notebooks reflect popular readership. The most well-known poet at this time seems to have been the Persian poet Jami, who was followed by two other poets who also wrote in the same language, Hafez and Amir Khusrow. However, the Turkic poets Ali-Shir Nava'i and Fuzuli are also commonly cited. Because of this diverse population and their role in political, cultural, and economic affairs, the Emirate of Bukhara cannot be considered solely an "Uzbek state". In 1924, when the Soviet Union established national and ethnic boundaries in Central Asia, many of the locals of the present-day countries of Uzbekistan and Tajikistan were unsure if they were Tajiks or Uzbeks.

In the Bukharan Emirate, the Uzbeks inhabited the center of Central Asia. The Lebap Region was populated by Turkmens, including the Salur in the Char Ju, and the Ersari and Saraq to the south of the town. During winter, the surroundings of the Syr Darya river and some of the Kyzylkum Desert was inhabited by Kazakh nomads. The surroundings of Bukhara and Qarakul had a small Arab population. The Karakalpak lived both in the desert west of Central Asia and near Samarqand.

The Tajiks, who were not tribal, were sometimes referred to as fārsīwān or fārsī-zabān ("Persian-speakers"). Usually, their place of origin or residence was represented by their nisba (such as Samarqandi, Bukhari, or Hisari). Persian speakers who lived in the mountains on the eastern and northern frontiers of Central Asia are sometimes referred to as "Ghalcha" by writers of the 18th century. There were many smaller groups in the emirate. Shia Farsi and Irani (Eroni) lived in Bukhara and Samarqand. Afghans, often from a merchant background, mostly populated the major cities, but also smaller towns such as Kulab, Tirmidh and Shirabad. There was also a Russian and Tatar community.

=== Culture ===
Since the 8th and 9th centuries, the common culture of the locals was Persian and Muslim. Persian was the language of civilisation par excellence and the principal language of culture, serving as the official and court language of Emirate of Bukhara. In contrast to rural areas or the nomad-roaming steppes, Bukhara, along with Samarqand, was always a hub of Persianate court culture and religious life. Due to the religious education it offered, the city itself was also known as Bukhārā-yi sharīf ("Bukhara the Noble"). The Bukharan emirate was based on Perso-Islamic systems of government and dynasty patrimonialism, just like other city-states in Central Asia.

The centuries-old Persianate "mirrors for princes" literature, combined with newer juridical state precedents was invoked by the Bukharan rulers to defend their authority. Persianate poetry, written in both Persian and Turkic, was central to courtly culture. Military titles were based on Turkic customs. To ensure good fortune in warfare, the rulers sought advice from Sufi shrines.

== Government ==
=== Administrative and territorial structure ===
During the reign of Amir Nasrullah, when the territory of the emirate was most expanded, Bukhara consisted of 30 regions (begliks). These were Karshi, Guzar, Chirakchi, Kitab, Shahrisabz, Yakkabog, Baysun, Denov, Sherabad, Hisar, Korategin, Darvoz, Baljuvan, Shugnon, Rushan, Kulob, Kurgantepa, Qobadiyon, Kalif, Karki, Burdalik, Kalakli, Narazm, Charjoi, Karmana, Ziyovuddin, Nurota, Khatirchi, Urgut and Samarkand regions. In addition to them, Jizzakh, Oratepa, Tashkent, Turkestan and other neighboring regions were also temporarily included in the emirate during this period.

By 1916 they were:

1. Baljuvon (now Khatlon Region, Tajikistan)
2. Hisar (now Tajikistan)
3. Burdalik (now Lebap Region, Turkmenistan)
4. Guzar (now Qashqadaryo Region, Uzbekistan)
5. Charjuy (now Lebap Region, Turkmenistan)
6. Darvaz (c 1878, now Darvoz district, Tajikistan)
7. Dehnav (now Surxondaryo Region, Uzbekistan)
8. Kabakli (now Lebap Region, Turkmenistan)
9. Karakul (now Bukhara Region, Uzbekistan)
10. Karategin (now Rasht district, Tajikistan)
11. Karshi (now Qashqadaryo Region, Uzbekistan)
12. Kattakurgan (now Samarkand region, Uzbekistan)
13. Kulyab (now Khatlon Region, Tajikistan)
14. Karshi (now Qashqadaryo Region, Uzbekistan)
15. Kerki (now Lebap Region, Turkmenistan)
16. Nurata (now Navoiy Region, Uzbekistan)
17. Panjikent (now Sughd province, Tajikistan)
18. Rushan (now Gorno-Badakhshan Autonomous region, Tajikistan)
19. Samarkand (now Samarqand Region, Uzbekistan – part of Russia since 1868
20. Shahrisabz (c 1870, now Kashkadarya Region, Uzbekistan)
21. Urgut (now Samarqand Region, Uzbekistan)
22. Falgar (now Sughd province, Tajikistan)

=== Military ===
The highest military power and command of the army belonged to the Emir. The main command of all infantry and all artillery was concentrated in the hands of the tupchi-bashi (chief of artillery), who, in case of receiving the rank of commander-in-chief, became the head of the entire Bukhara army (including cavalry). The provision of the troops was under the jurisdiction of the Kush-Begi (Uzbek: qushbegi, 'vizier'), and the management of monetary and clothing allowances was entrusted to the durbin (state treasurer), and the in-kind allowance was entrusted to the Ziaetdin Bek. The militia came under the jurisdiction of the military authorities only after being called up for service.

From 1837 to 1845, the naib and head of the artillerymen, Abdusamatkhan, a native of Tabriz, enjoyed great influence in the political life of the Bukhara Emirate. Abdusamatkhan was the first organizer of a regiment of sarbazs and a detachment of artillerymen - topchi in Bukhara.

Those serving in the cavalry had to have their own horses, and the artillery was supplied with horses by the Ziaetdin Bek, who was also in charge of the treatment of horses and fodder provisions.

The Bukharan army had the following ranks (ranks):

- Alaman: private
- Churagasy: non-commissioned officer, sergeant major
- Yuz-bashi: (cf. Turk. Yüzbaşı: captain), commander of a hundred, lieutenant
- Churan-bashi: or lieutenant
- Tuksaba: regimental commander, lieutenant colonel or colonel
- Kurgonbegi: Brigadier General
- Mingboshi: commander of several regiments, divisional general, major general
- Farmonchi: Commander of the Troops, Marshal, Lieutenant General

Initially, the Bukhara army consisted exclusively of horsemen, but as a result of the military reform of 1837, sarbaz infantrymen appeared. Later, the infantry consisted of 2 bayraks (companies, hundreds) of the Emir's Guard (jilau) and 13 serkerde (battalions) of sarbazs of five companies, a total of 14 thousand people. The armament of the infantry consisted of hammer guns, partly smooth, partly rifled, with bayonet knives; In 1883, by order of the Turkestan Governor-General, 1000 Berdan rifles with 100 thousand cartridges were presented to the Emir. The officers were armed with sabers and revolvers.

The cavalry consisted of 20 serkerde (10 thousand) galabatyrs (sipahi), who were supposed to act during the battle in cavalry formation, and 8 regiments (4 thousand) of hasabardars, something like mounted archers, armed with falconets, one for two; A total of 14 thousand people. The armament of the cavalry consisted of pikes and sabers, daggers and pistols, etc. Instead of pikes, the Khasabardars were armed with cast-iron matchlock falconets, weighing 50 pounds, with a stand and a sight for firing at a distance of up to 300 fathoms. Cavalrymen sometimes engaged in horse riding, but this was done on their own initiative.

In 1837, the Emir organized a battalion of artillerymen (tupchi). Initially, artillery (Uzbek: Toʻp) consisted of one horse battery, armed with six 12-pounder copper guns with six charging boxes, the place of permanent deployment of which was Bukhara, and the same six-gun battery at the disposal of the Hissar Bek. Then^{[when?]}the field artillery increased to 20 guns. The servants were armed with sabres. The artillerymen formed a separate company of 300 people and were trained only in the techniques of the guns. In the city of Bukhara there were cannon foundries and gunpowder factories. At the beginning of the 20th century, English machine guns (Vickers) appeared in the Bukhara army.

In the second half of the 19th century, after the subjugation of Bukhara by the Russian Empire, the army of the Emir of Bukhara numbered, according to various estimates, from 10 to 14 thousand sarbaz. The mobilization capabilities of the Bukhara Khanate made it possible to field up to 60,000 soldiers in wartime. 10,000 men with 14 guns are in the capital, 2,000 men with 6 guns are in Shakhrisabz and Kitab, and 3,000 people make up the garrisons of the fortified cities of Ziadin, Karman, Guzar, Sherabad, etc. The most significant fortifications are in Bukhara, Karshi, Nurata, Vardanzi, and Hissar. The maintenance of the army cost ^{the} Emir about 11/2 million rubles a year. Allowances for servicemen were given partly in money, and partly in kind in the form of a certain amount of batmans of wheat.

Camp musters were partially replaced by annual summer trips of the Emir to Karshi and Shaar, where he was accompanied by six battalions of sarbaz, one artillery company and a cavalry regiment, but these trips had no real significance for increasing combat readiness. Sarbaz only knew how to make rifle moves and a few formations.

Senior officers and generals wore a turban and robes, sometimes supplementing it with Russian epaulettes. Sarbaz infantry and artillerymen wore black hats, black cloth uniforms with red flaps on the collar and red shoulder straps, black (ceremonial) trousers or red leather chembars (everyday), high boots. In summer, sarbaz wore white linen shirts, and officers wore white tunics.

The Emir's Guards units had a special uniform: red single-breasted uniforms, white trousers, low black astrakhan hats.

== Foreign relations ==
Bukhara initially resisted Russian expansion into Central Asia, but would become a Russian protectorate.

== Economy ==
During the late 19th and early 20th centuries, the majority of the Emirate's exports consisted primarily of cotton, wool, silk and related products, wool and oils. Bukhara was also considered the center of the Central Asian Astrakhan trade, obtained from the skin of karakul sheep. These skins were brought from around the breeding regions in neighbouring Karakul, Chorjou, Karki, Karshi, Khorezm and Afghanistan.

Trade for the most part largely interacted with western nations, predominantly: the Russian Empire, the United Kingdom, France, Italy, Germany (and its predecessor states) and in later years, the United States of America.

== List of emirs ==
Titular Name	Personal Name	Reign
Ataliq I اتالیق	Khudayar Bey خدایار بیگ	?
Ataliq II اتالیق	Muhammad Hakim محمد حکیم	?–1747
Ataliq III اتالیق	Muhammad Rahim محمد رحیم	1747–1753
Amir I امیر	Muhammad Rahim محمد رحیم	1753–1756
Khan خان	Muhammad Rahim محمد رحیم	1756–1758
Ataliq IV اتالیق	Daniyal biy دانیال بیگ	1758–1785
Amir Masum امیر معصوم	Shahmurad شاہ مراد بن دانیال بیگ	1785–1800
Amir II امیر	Haydar bin Shahmurad حیدر تورہ بن شاہ مراد	1800–1826
Amir III امیر	Mir Hussein bin Haydar حسین بن حیدر تورہ	1826–1827
Amir IV امیر	Umar bin Haydar عمر بن حیدر تورہ	1827
Amir V امیر	Nasr-Allah bin Haydar Tora نصراللہ بن حیدر تورہ	1827–1860
Amir VI امیر	Muzaffar bin Nasrullah مظفر الدین بن نصراللہ	1860–1885
Amir VII امیر	Abdul-Ahad bin Muzaffar al-Din عبدل احد بن مظفر الدین	1885–1910
Amir VIII امیر	Muhammad Alim Khan bin Abdul-Ahad محمد عالم خان بن عبدل احد	1910–1920
Overthrow of Emirate of Bukhara by Bukharan People's Soviet Republic, which, in turn, was forcibly replaced by Bolsheviks.

- Pink Rows denote progenitor chiefs serving as Tutors (Ataliqs) & Viziers to the Khans of Bukhara.
- Green Rows denote chiefs who took over reign of government from the Janids and placed puppet Khans.
- A photo of Mohammed Alim Khan, final emir 1911–1920, is shown at Emir.

== Literature ==
- Malikov A., "The Russian conquest of the Bukharan Emirate: military and diplomatic aspects", Central Asian Survey, Volume 33, issue 2, 2014, pp. 180–198.
