= Manghud =

Mongol tribe of the Urud-Manghud federation

House of Manghud
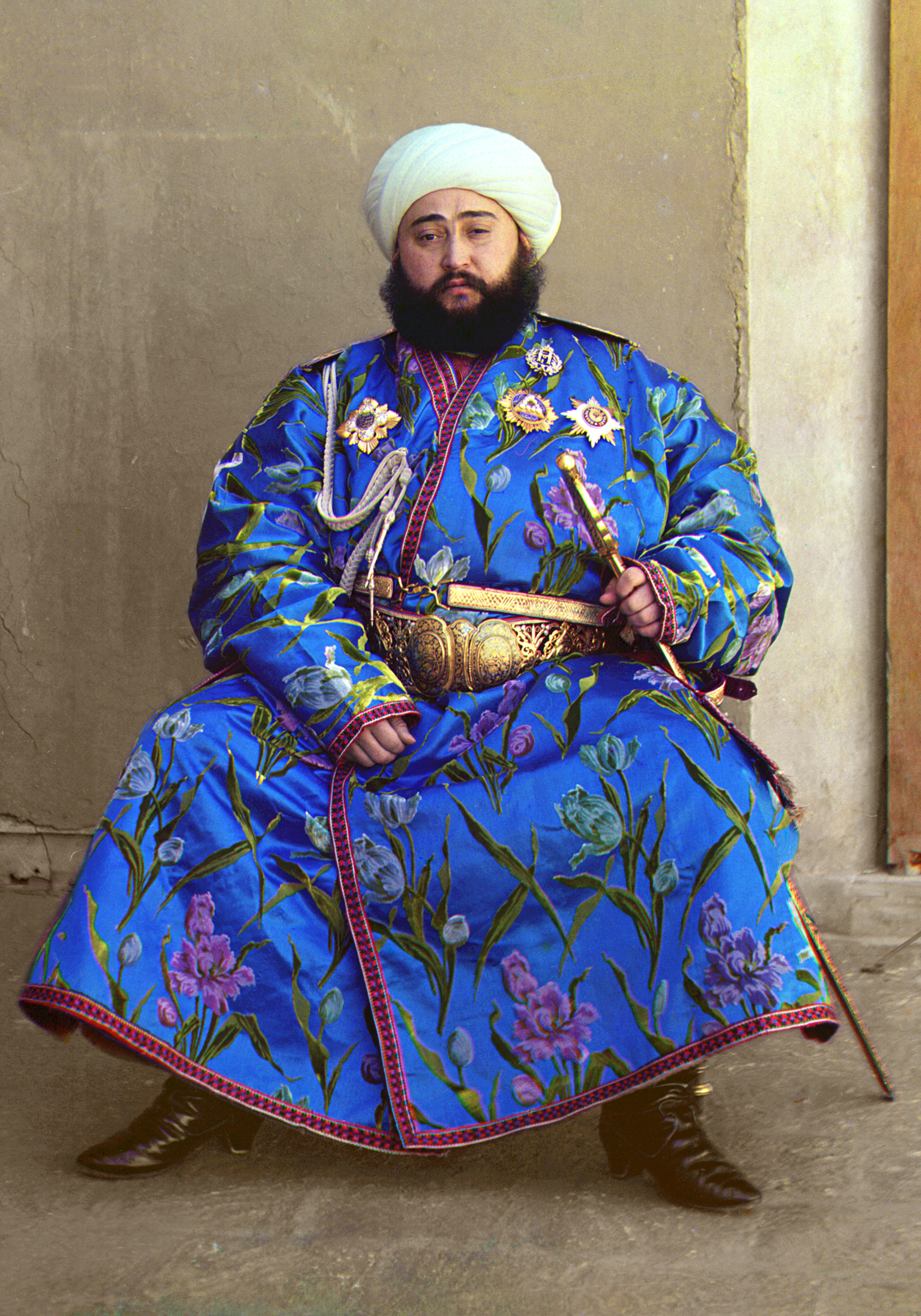
- Emir Alim Khan the last ruler and the last head of Manghud Dynasty
- Parent family: Kiyat Borjigin
- Country: Khamag Mongol Khanate; Mongol Empire; Golden Horde; Nogai Horde; Emirate of Bukhara
- Current region: Asia; Europe
- Founded: around early-11th centuries
- Founder: Prince Mangqutai (an original Manghud founder) Nogai Khan (later merged with the lineage of Nogai Khan, forming the Manqit dynasty and drawing legitimacy from Golden Ulus traditions and Borjigin imperial descent) Muhammad Rahim (founded the Uzbek Manghit dynasty and became the Atalyk of Bukhara after the death of Abu al-Fayz Khan in 1747)
- Final ruler: Alim Khan
- Final head: Alim Khan
- Titles: Khan; Emir; Sayyid
- Traditions: Tengrism later Sunni Islam
- Dissolution: 30 August 1920
- Deposition: 28 April 1944
- Cadet branches: Nogai dynasty Manghit dynasty (Uzbeks)

The Manghud, or Manghit (Mongolian: Мангуд, romanized: Mangud; Chagatay: منقت, romanized: Manqït; Uzbek: Mangʻit) were a Mongol tribe of the Urud-Manghud federation and mainly a sub-clan of Kiyat Borjigin, but later remixed with Golden Ultai, Genghis Khan Imperial Borjigin Descent like Nogai Khan, The Manghuds (also spelled Mangkits or Mangits) who moved to the Desht-i Qipchaq steppe became Turkified. They established the Nogai Horde in the 14th century and the Manghit dynasty to rule the Emirate of Bukhara in 1785. They took the Islamic title of Emir instead of the title of Khan, since they were not descendants of Genghis Khan and rather based their legitimacy as rulers on Islam. However, Persian historian Rashid-al-Din Hamadani who chronicled the Mongols, claimed that many old Mongolian clans (such as Barlas, Urad, Manghud, Taichiut, Chonos, Kiyat) were founded by Borjigin members. The clan name was used for Mongol vanguards as well. Members of the clan live in several regions of Central Asia and Mongolia.

== Origins ==
Manghud, or, Manghut Clan founding around early-11th and between 11th Centuries, by a Kiyat Borjigin prince named Mangqutai, Mangqutai he was the second son of Nachin Baghatur, Nachin Baghatur was the seventh son of Menen Tudun, Menen Tudun was the son of Habich Baghatur and Habich Baghatur was the son of Bodonchar Khan the founder of Borjigid Clan.

== Manghuds in the Mongol Empire ==
According to ancient sources, they were derived from the Khiyad Mongols. The Manghuds and the Uruuds were war-like people from the Mongolian plateau. Some notable Manghud warriors supported Genghis Khan (1162–1227), while a body of them resisted his rise to power. When the Mongol Empire began to expand westward, the Manghud people were spread westward into the Middle East along with many other Mongol tribes. In the Golden Horde, the Manghuds supported Nogai (d. 1299) and established their own semi-independent horde from the khans in Sarai.

After Nogai's death in 1299, the majority of Manghud warriors joined the service of Tokhta Khan. Their chieftain Edigu, the powerful warlord of the Golden Horde, officially founded the Nogai Horde or Manghit Horde in the 14th-15th centuries. Majmu al-tawarikh [ru], included Manghit clan as one of ninety-two Uzbek [ru] clans of the Golden Horde.

=== Military unit of the Mongols ===
The mangudai or mungadai were military units of the Mongol Empire, but sources differ wildly in their descriptions. One source states that references to Mongol light cavalry "suicide troops" date back to the 13th century. However, a United States Army author believes that Mangudai was the name of a 13th-century Mongol warlord who created an arduous selection process to test potential leaders. The term is used by element of the United States Army as a name for multi-day tests of Soldiers' endurance and warrior skills.

== Edigu’s Legacy ==
Edigu (also Edigü, Edigey, Eðivkäy or Edege Mangit; 1352–1419) was a Turco-Mongol emir of the White Horde who founded a new political entity, which came to be known as the Nogai Horde. He was the leader of the eastern begs and became a dominant figure in the Golden Horde by the end of the 14th century. Edigu was from the Manghit tribe, the son of Kutlukiya (Kuttykiya), a Turco-Mongol noble, who managed to unite all of Jochi's lands under his rule.

== Nogai Horde ==
Some of the Manghuds assimilated into Turkic people and these Manghuds became Manghit (Mangit) tribe of the Turks. The Nogais protected the northern borders of Astrakhan and Crimean khanates, and through organized raids to the northern steppes prevented Russian and Lithuanian settlements. Many Nogais joined the service of Crimean khan. Settling there, they contributed to the formation of the Crimean Tatars. However, Nogais were not only good soldiers, they also had considerable agricultural skills. Their basic social unit was the semi-autonomous 'ulus' or band. But Nogais were proud of their nomadic traditions and independence, which they considered superior to settled agricultural life.

At the beginning of the 17th century, the Kalmyks or the Oirats, migrated from the steppes of southern Siberia on the banks of the Irtysh River to the Lower Volga region about 1630. The Kalmyks expelled the Nogais who fled to the plains of northern Caucasus and to the Crimea under the Ottoman Empire. A few part of them joined to Kazakh Khanate as part of Little jüz.

== Manghit dynasty ==
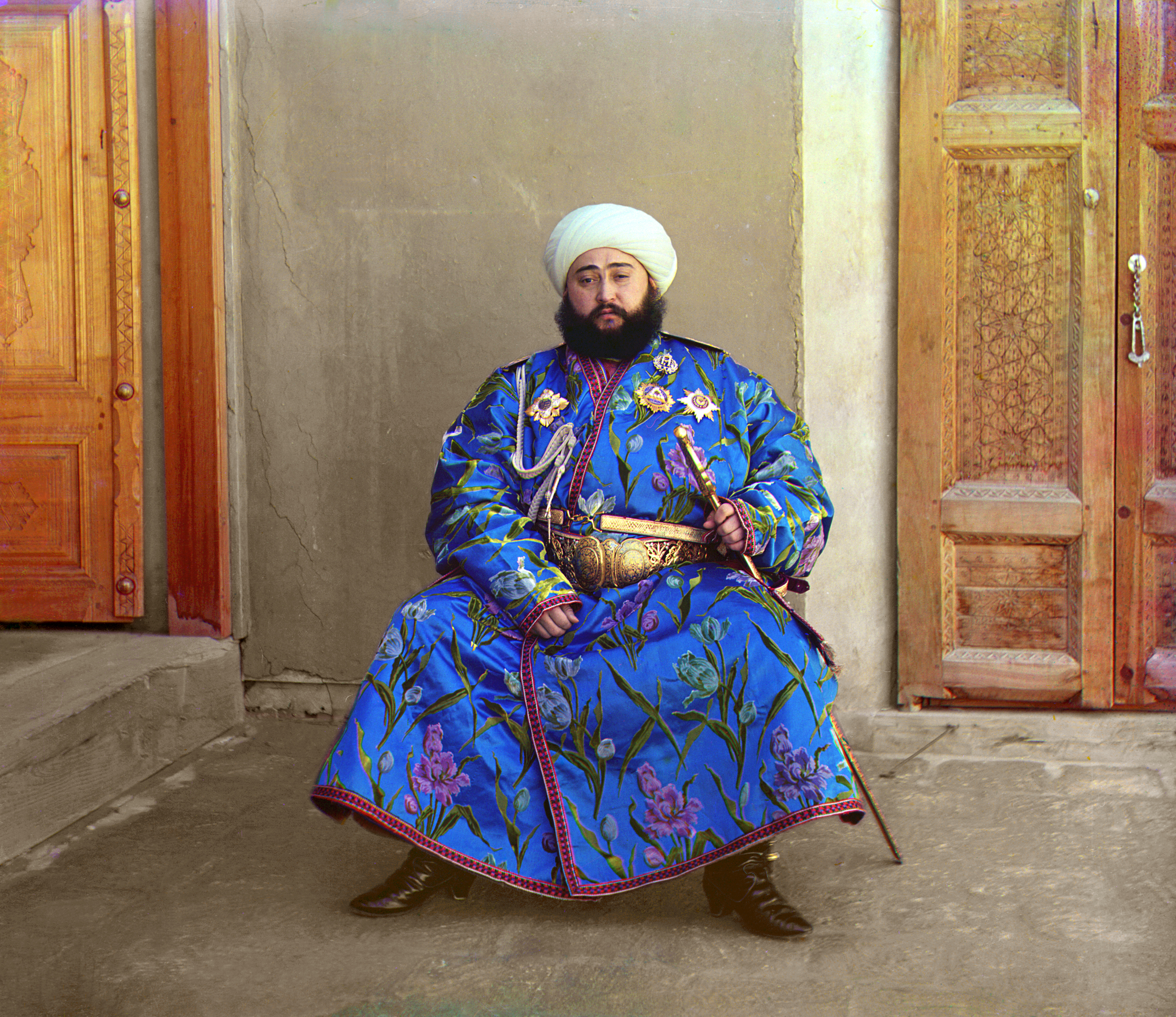
Alim Khan, the last Manghit khan in Bukhara, 1911

The Manghits had been settled by Genghis Khan around the city of Qarshi. Qarshi would continue to serve as the Manghits' base of power under the Bukhara Khanate. In the 18th century, the basins of the Amu Darya and Syr Darya passed under the control of three Uzbek khanates, claiming legitimacy in their descent from Genghis Khan. These were, from west to east, the Qunggirats based on Khiva in Khwārezm (1717–1920), the Mangits in Bukhara (1753–1920), and the Mings in Kokand (Qǔqon; c. 1710–1876).

The Manghit dynasty was founded by a common Uzbek family that ruled the Emirate of Bukhara from 1785 to 1920. Manghit power in the Khanate of Bukhara began to grow in the early 18th century, due to the emirs position as ataliq to the khan. The family effectively came to power after Nader Shah's death in 1747, and the assassination of the ruling Abu al-Fayz Khan and his young son Abdalmumin by the ataliq Muhammad Rahim Bi.

From 1747 to the 1780s, the Manġits ruled behind the scenes, until the emir Shah Murad declared himself the open ruler, establishing the Emirate of Bukhara. The last emir of the dynasty, Mohammed Alim Khan, was ousted by the Soviet Red Army in September 1920, and fled to Afghanistan. There is disagreement over whether the dynasty descends from simple Uzbeks or of true Mongolian origin. According to the Russian orientalist N.V. Khanykova, the Manġit dynasty was considered the oldest Uzbek family in the Bukhara Khanate descending from Timur Malik; from the division of which the tuk came the reigning dynasty, in addition, this clan enjoyed some special privileges.

The Manghit dynasty issued coins from 1787 up until the Soviet takeover.

=== Heads/rulers of the Manghit dynasty of the Emirate of Bukhara ===
Titular Name	Personal Name	Reign
Ataliq I اتالیق	Khudayar Bey خدایار بیگ	?
Ataliq II اتالیق	Muhammad Hakim محمد حکیم	?–1747
Ataliq III اتالیق	Muhammad Rahim محمد رحیم	1747–1753
Amir I امیر	Muhammad Rahim محمد رحیم	1753–1756
Khan خان	Muhammad Rahim محمد رحیم	1756–1758
Ataliq IV اتالیق	Daniyal biy دانیال بیگ	1758–1785
Amir Masum امیر معصوم	Shahmurad شاہ مراد بن دانیال بیگ	1785–1800
Amir II امیر	Haydar bin Shahmurad حیدر تورہ بن شاہ مراد	1800–1826
Amir III امیر	Mir Hussein bin Haydar حسین بن حیدر تورہ	1826–1827
Amir IV امیر	Umar bin Haydar عمر بن حیدر تورہ	1827
Amir V امیر	Nasr-Allah bin Haydar Tora نصراللہ بن حیدر تورہ	1827–1860
Amir VI امیر	Muzaffar bin Nasrullah مظفر الدین بن نصراللہ	1860–1885
Amir VII امیر	Abdul-Ahad bin Muzaffar al-Din عبدل احد بن مظفر الدین	1885–1910
Amir VIII امیر	Muhammad Alim Khan bin Abdul-Ahad محمد عالم خان بن عبدل احد	1910–1920
Overthrow of Emirate of Bukhara by Bukharan People's Soviet Republic, which, in turn, was forcibly replaced by Bolsheviks.

- Pink Rows Signifies progenitor chiefs serving as Tutors (Ataliqs) & Viziers to the Khans of Bukhara.
  - Green Rows Signifies chiefs who took over reign of government from the Janids and placed puppet Khans.

=== House of Manghud of Bukhara ===
House of Manghud

Bukhara Khanate
Bukhara Emirate

Khudayar
Muhammad-Hakim	Daniyal
Muhammad-Badal	Muhammad-Rahim r. 1756–1758	Shah-Murad r. 1785–1799
Narbutah	Haydar r. 1799–1826
Fadl-Tura r. 1758–1758	Husayn r. 1826–1826	Nasrullah r. 1827–1860	Umar r. 1826–1827
Muzaffar r. 1860–1885
Abdul-Ahad r. 1885–1910
Muhammad-Alim r. 1910–1920

== Descendants ==
Their descendants, the Nogai and Karakalpak people live in Dagestan and Khorazm. Others are the present-day Khalkha Mongols who live in Mongolia and the Baarin banner in Inner Mongolia. While the Manghits are found among the Tatars in Russia, the Bashkirs and the Kazakhs.

The daughter of the last Emir Alim Khan, Shukria Alimi Raad, worked as a broadcaster for Radio Afghanistan. Shukria Raad left Afghanistan with her family three months after Soviet troops invaded the country in December 1979. With her husband, also a journalist, and two children she fled to Pakistan, and then through Germany to the United States. In 1982 she joined the Voice of America, working for many years as a broadcaster for VOA's Dari Service. She was interviewed in BBC Farsi, where she talked about her father and how the Emirate of Bukhara fell into the Soviets hand. At the end she talked about how she wanted to raise her children as Tajiks, and that she is Tajik. Alim Khan also had a son named Shahmurad, who denounced his father in 1929 (at the age of seven) and later served in the Soviet Army. During his governance in Bukhara, he also had a son named Qasem who was killed by the Bolshevik revolutionaries. Qasem had only one son who, when he was 13 years old, escaped from Bukhara to Iran-Mashhad with his stepfather. When he arrived in Iran, he took the name Husein Bukharaei.
