= Muzaffar bin Nasrullah =

Emir of Bukhara from 1860 to 1885

Muzaffar
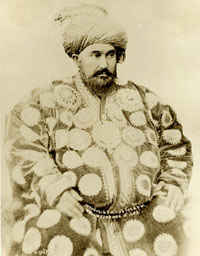

Emir of Bukhara
- Reign: 1860 – 1885
- Predecessor: Nasrullah
- Successor: 'Abd al-Ahad
- Born: 1824 or 1825; Bukhara
- Died: 1885; Bukhara
- Burial: Bukhara
- House: Manghit dynasty
- Father: Nasrullah
- Religion: Islam

Muzaffar bin Nasrullah (Chagatai and Persian: مظفر بن نصرالله) was the Uzbek ruler (Emir) of Bukhara from 1860 to 1885, succeeding his father was Nasrullah in 1860.

== Biography ==
He was born in 1824 or 1825 in Bukhara.

Having entrenched himself on the throne, Emir Muzaffar removed the senior officials appointed by his father from their posts, confiscated their property and appointed his loyal people in their places. However, the city of Shakhrisabz became independent. With great difficulty, he suppressed the separatist movement in Hisar, Kulab and Baljuvan. During the reign of Muzaffar, his Qushbegi (prime minister), Muhammad Biy (1811-1889), a Persian by origin, enjoyed great influence. Having unlimited influence over Muzaffar, he was able to bring other members of his family to higher positions.

The beginning of the reign of Emir Muzaffar was accompanied by some successes in foreign policy. With the support of Bukhara, Khudayar Khan came to power in Kokand.

In 1864, Russian troops under the leadership of general Konstantin von Kaufmann moved into Central Asia, intending to capture border regions and finally the Emirate itself. Despite repeated attempts to change military tactics and the support of Turkish military specialists, the Bukhara troops were defeated three times by the Russians under Kaufmann's leadership in the battles of Irjar (1866), Chupan Ata (1868) and Zerabulak (1868). On June 2, 1868, the Emirate of Bukhara became a protectorate of Tsarist Russia.

From July 1868 until his death in 1885, the emir maintained peaceful relations with the Russian Empire. A number of Russian embassies were sent to him. The reception ceremonies for the ambassadors were carried out in the Uzbek language. In 1873, he was forced by the Russians to ban the Bukharan slave trade; he was also obliged to promise the Russians to abolish slavery itself in 1883, but never did so.

Emir Muzaffar himself honored the work of the poet Alisher Nava'i and in 1872 presented the manuscript of Navai's Divan to the British Queen Victoria.

== Family ==
Emir Muzaffar had thirteen sons:

- Seyid Abdumalik (1848-1909)
- Seyid Nuraddin, former bek of Chardju (1851-1879)
- Seyid Abdul-Mumin, born in 1852, was appointed bek of Hissar during Muzaffar's lifetime
- Seyid Abdul-Ahad, later ascended the throne of Bukhara
- Seyid Abdul-Fattah, born in 1857, died shortly after his trip to St. Petersburg in 1869
- Seyid Abdul-Sammad, was bek of Chirakchi
- Seyid Siddyk, was appointed bek of Chardju by the late emir after the death of Nuraddin; upon Abdul-Ahad's accession to the throne, he was recalled to Bukhara;
- Seid-Akram, bek of Guzars;
- Seid-Mir-Mansur, born in 1863, lieutenant of the 3rd Sumy Dragoon Regiment, served and lived in Moscow.
- Nasir ad-din ibn amir Muzaffar
- Seid Mir Nazhmeddin Tura

In addition, Muzaffar had several sons who died during his lifetime.

== Death ==
Emir Muzaffar died in 1885 and was buried in the Ishan Imlo cemetery in Bukhara, next to the graves of his ancestors. His son, Emir Seid Abdul Ahad Khan, succeeded him. The Ishan Imlo cemetery was destroyed during the Soviet era.

== Literature ==
- Akhmad Donish, Puteshestviye iz Bukhary Peterburg. Dushanbe, 1960.
- Bregel, Y. (2009). The new Uzbek states: Bukhara, Khiva and Khoqand: C. 1750–1886. In N. Di Cosmo, A. Frank, & P. Golden (Eds.), The Cambridge History of Inner Asia: The Chinggisid Age (pp. 392-411). Cambridge: Cambridge University Press

Preceded by Nasrullah	Emir of Bukhara; 1860–1885	Succeeded by 'Abd al-Ahad
