= Haydar bin Shahmurad =

Emir of Bukhara from 1799 to 1826

Emir of Bukhara
- Reign: 1799–1826
- Predecessor: Shahmurad
- Successor: Mir Hussein bin Haydar
- Born: January 30, 1775; Bukhara
- Died: November 12, 1826 (aged 51); Bukhara
- Burial: Bukhara
Temple name
- Taizong (太宗)
- House: Manghit dynasty
- Father: Shahmurad
- Religion: Islam

Haydar bin Shahmurad (Chagatai and Persian: حیدر بن شاه مراد) was the Uzbek Emir of Bukhara from 1799 to 1826. His father was Emir Shahmurad. (1785–1799). After the death of Shah Murad in December 1799, Haydar bin Shahmurad came to power.

At the beginning of the 19th century, the Bukhara Emirate included the Zeravshan valley, Kashka-Darya and the Merv oasis. Bukhara, on the other hand, owned a significant part of modern Afghan Turkestan, as well as a number of regions of present-day Tajikistan, sometimes also Khojent, Ura-Tyube.

The period of the reign of Emir Haydar was rich in events. He had to suppress the rebellion of the Ktay Kipchaks in Miankal, the Uzbek tribe Keneges in Shakhrisabz. According to local historian Ahmad Donish, Emir Haydar "faced with strife and tribal strife, pacified the elders and heads of tribes and after that began to rule quietly." Foreigners were appointed to government positions instead of Uzbek leaders. “At first glance, such actions seemed to be salutary for the state, but later they brought great harm to the outskirts of the country, since during the reign of his son, Emir Nasrullo, these elders and tribal leaders could not perform any duties and gave the region to enemies.

Emir Haydar maintained diplomatic relations with the Ottoman Empire and the Russian Empire. In 1803, the Bukhara ambassador Ishmukhammad Baikishiev was received by the Russian emperor Alexander I in St. Petersburg.

In 1815, the Bukhara ambassador Muhammad Yusuf divanbegi arrived in St. Petersburg to congratulate the Russian emperor on the victory over Napoleon.

Emir Haydar died in 1826 and was succeeded by Mir Hussein bin Haydar, (1826–1827) who in 1827 was succeeded by Nasrullah.

== Literature ==
- Akhmad Donish, Puteshestviye iz Bukhary Peterburg. Dushanbe, 1960.
- Holzwarth, Wolfgang. "Community Elders and State Agents: Īlbēgīs in the Emirate of Bukhara around 1900." Eurasian Studies (2011).
- Holzwarth, Wolfgang. "War and peace in pre-colonial Bukhara: the Keneges treaties (1820s-1840s)." In Aus den Tiefenschichten der Texte: Beiträge zur Turko-iranischen Welt von der Islamisierung bis zur Gegenwart, pp. 191–231. Reichert, 2019.

Preceded by Shahmurad	Emir of Bukhara; 1799–1826	Succeeded by Mir Hussein bin Haydar
