= Shoh Axsi Madrasa =

Madrasa in Bukhara, Uzbekistan

General information
- Architectural style: Central Asian
- Location: Shoh Axsi quarter, Bukhara Region
- Year built: 16th century
- Owner: Hazrat Okhund Poyanda Muhammad Husayniy Shoh Axsaviy

Technical details
- Material: baked brick, wood, stone and gypsum
- Floor count: 2

The Shoh Axsi Madrasa was an Islamic school (madrasa) located in Bukhara Region, Uzbekistan.

== Background ==
The madrasa has not been preserved until today. Shoh Axsi Madrasa was founded in the 16th century in Shoh Axsi quarter, during the reign of Abdullakhan II, the ruler of the Khanate of Bukhara, by Hazrat Okhund Poyanda Muhammad Husayniy Shoh Axsaviy, a famous representative of the Naqshbandiya Sufi order. The researcher Abdusattor Jumanazarov has studied a number of waqf documents related to this madrasa and provided information about the madrasa. Several documents related to the activities of the madrasa have been found.

One document mentions that Kamol Hoqandiy, who studied at this madrasa, became ill. The head of the madrasa was a mudarris (teacher). Two students lived in each room of the madrasa. The documents state that one of the donations of Sadr rais Mir Badriddin was used to repair 8 rooms on the eastern side of Shoh Axsi khanqah (Sufi lodge) and that students lived there.

Shoh Axsaviy was a Sufi. He was one of the famous representatives of the Naqshbandiya order in the 16th century. After Abdullakhan II completed the construction of his own madrasa in 1566, he chose Shoh Axsaviy and appointed him as the chief mudarris of the madrasa. Shoh Axsaviy died in Bukhara in 1601 and was buried outside the Mozori Sharif gate. The area where he was buried was named after him. Sadri Ziyo wrote that there were 12 rooms in Shoh Axsi Madrasa. Shoh Axsi Madrasa consisted of 12 rooms. The madrasa was built in the style of Central Asian architecture. The madrasa was made of baked brick, wood, stone and gypsum.

== See also ==
- Ismoilxoja Madrasa
- Shirgaron Madrasa
- Abdushukurboy Madrasa
- Ikromkhoja Madrasa
- Abdulloh Kotib Madrasa
- Chuchuk Oyim Sangin Madrasa
- Yoshi Uzoqbek Madrasa
- Muhammad Ali hoji Madrasa
