= Yoshi Uzoqbek Madrasa =

Madrasa in Bukhara, Uzbekistan

General information
- Architectural style: Central Asian
- Location: Koyi Mirgkash neighborhood, Bukhara Region
- Year built: 1873-1874
- Owner: Yoshi Uzoqbek, son of Muhammad Amin Tochiboshi

Technical details
- Material: baked brick, wood, stone and plaster
- Floor count: 2

The Yoshi Uzoqbek Madrasa was a madrasa located in Bukhara Region, Uzbekistan. It no longer exists today.

== Background ==
Yoshi Uzoqbek Madrasa was built in the Koyi Mirgkash neighborhood, during the reign of Amir Nasrullo of the Emirate of Bukhara, by Yoshi Uzoqbek. Yoshi Uzoqbek was the son of Muhammad Amin Tochiboshi, one of the influential figures of the Emirate of Bukhara. Muhammad Amin served as the head of the artillery during the reigns of Amir Shohmurod and Amir Haydar. Yoshi Uzoqbek also worked in the palace of the Emirate of Bukhara. He played an important role in the political life of the country during the reign of Amir Nasrullo. Yoshi Uzoqbek was known by names such as “Yosh Uzoq”, “Yoshi Uzoq”. He participated in Amir Nasrullo’s military campaigns.

The scholar Abdusattor Jumanazarov studied a number of endowment documents related to this madrasa and provided information about it. For this madrasa, Shokirjon, son of Mahmud Chinnifurushlar, endowed several shops near his place in 1873-1874. Two more endowment documents have been found and studied for the madrasa. The names of many teachers who taught at this madrasa are mentioned in these documents. For example, mulla Abduvajidxoja’s salary was 45 golden coins, and mulla Boqir’s salary was 25 golden coins. Information about the students who studied at the madrasa is also provided. The madrasa was destroyed before the October Revolution. Sadri Ziyo wrote that Yoshi Uzoqbek Madrasa had 15 rooms. Yoshi Uzoqbek Madrasa consisted of 18 rooms. The madrasa was built in the Central Asian architectural style. The madrasa was made of baked brick, wood, stone and plaster.

== See also ==
- Ismoilxoja Madrasa
- Shirgaron Madrasa
- Abdushukurboy Madrasa
- Ikromkhoja Madrasa
- Abdulloh Kotib Madrasa
- Chuchuk Oyim Sangin Madrasa
- Shoh Axsi Madrasa
- Muhammad Ali hoji Madrasa
