= Avazboy Arab Madrasa =

Madrasa in Bukhara, Uzbekistan

General information
- Architectural style: Central Asian
- Location: Sofiyon street, Bukhara Region
- Year built: 1777
- Opened: 1777
- Owner: Muhammad Avazboy Mir Hazor

Technical details
- Material: Baked brick, wood, stone and plaster

The Avazboy Arab Madrasa was a historical institution located in Bukhara Region. The madrasa has not been preserved to this day.

== Background ==
Avazboy Arab Madrasa was founded in 1777 near the Sofiyon Mosque, during the reign of Amir Shohmurod of the Emirate of Bukhara, by Muhammad Avazboy Mir Hazor. The researcher Abdusattor Jumanazarov studied a number of waqf documents related to this madrasa and provided information about it. The waqf document states that the madrasa was built by Muhammad Avazboy Mir Hazor near the Sofiyon street, and had a pool on the south side. The madrasa had roads on the north and east sides. Nimhazorayi Pirmastda endowed 100 plots of land for this madrasa. Muhammad Avazboy's uncle Mirzaboy Mir Hazor appointed his son Muhammad Sharifboy as the trustee of the madrasa. Avazboy Arab Madrasa had 1 teacher, 1 barber, and 1 seller. The madrasa had 34 students, each sharing a room with another. The students who studied at the madrasa did not leave their places of study for more than 2 months and 10 days without a valid reason. If such an incident occurred, they would lose all their privileges. Many waqf documents have been preserved about the activities of the madrasa. The first waqf document dates back to 1777, and Muhammad Sharif stated that the madrasa was built on that date. Another waqf document lists the names of the teachers who taught at this madrasa. Mulla Muhammad Yusuf, Mulla Abduqayum, Mulla Abduvohid were among the teachers who worked at the madrasa. Mulla Abduqayum, who taught at this madrasa, received a salary of 18 gold coins. Sadri Ziyo only wrote the name of the madrasa in his list of madrasas. Avazboy Arab Madrasa consisted of 17 rooms. The madrasa was built in the style of Central Asian architecture. The madrasa was made of baked brick, wood, stone and plaster.

== See also ==
- Ismoilxoja Madrasa
- Shirgaron Madrasa
- Abdushukurboy Madrasa
- Ikromkhoja Madrasa
- Abdulloh Kotib Madrasa
- Chuchuk Oyim Sangin Madrasa
- Yoshi Uzoqbek Madrasa
- Shoh Axsi Madrasa
- Muhammad Ali hoji Madrasa
