= Chuchuk Oyim Sangin Madrasa =

Madrasa in Bukhara, Uzbekistan

General information
- Architectural style: Central Asian
- Location: Naqib neighborhood, Bukhara Region
- Year built: 1792-1793
- Owner: Chuchuk Oyim, daughter of Muhammad Shukur Toqsabo

Technical details
- Material: baked brick, wood, stone and plaster
- Floor count: 2

The Chuchuk Oyim Sangin Madrasa was a madrasa located in Bukhara Region. It no longer exists today.

== Background ==
Chuchuk Oyim Sangin Madrasa was built in 1792-1793 in the Naqib neighborhood, during the reign of Amir Shohmurod of the Emirate of Bukhara, by Chuchuk Oyim, daughter of Muhammad Shukur Toqsabo. The annual endowment amount of the madrasa was 25,000 coins, and it had two floors. According to Olga Suxareva’s data, Hakim Oyim Madrasa was located in the Chuqur neighborhood and it was shown as Chuchuk Oyim Madrasa on the Parfyonov-Fenin map, and Boqixon Naqib Madrasa was also present in this neighborhood. This neighborhood was called Chorbogi Boqixon until the 18th century.

The scholar Abdusattor Jumanazarov studied a number of endowment documents related to this madrasa and provided information about it. Two endowment documents have been preserved for this madrasa. According to the first endowment documents, the madrasa was located near the tomb of Eshon Hoji. The madrasa had a street on the west and east sides, houses on the north side, and a road leading to the grave of Hazrat Eshon on the south side. Chuchuk Oyim Sangin Madrasa also had a mosque and high domes. The second endowment document states that the madrasa was endowed by Chuchuk Oyim, daughter of Qulmuhammad Dodhoh. The madrasa continued to operate until the Soviet period. In addition, there is also information about the teachers and students who worked and studied at the madrasa. Sadri Ziyo wrote that Chuchuk Oyim Sangin Madrasa had 13 rooms. The madrasa was built in the Central Asian architectural style. The madrasa was made of baked brick, wood, stone and plaster.

== See also ==
- Ismoilxoja Madrasa
- Shirgaron Madrasa
- Abdushukurboy Madrasa
- Ikromkhoja Madrasa
- Abdulloh Kotib Madrasa
- Yoshi Uzoqbek Madrasa
- Shoh Axsi Madrasa
- Muhammad Ali hoji Madrasa
