= Daniyol Ataliq madrasah =

Madrasa in Bukhara, Uzbekistan

Doniyol Otaliq madrasah
- Doniyol Otaliq madrasasi
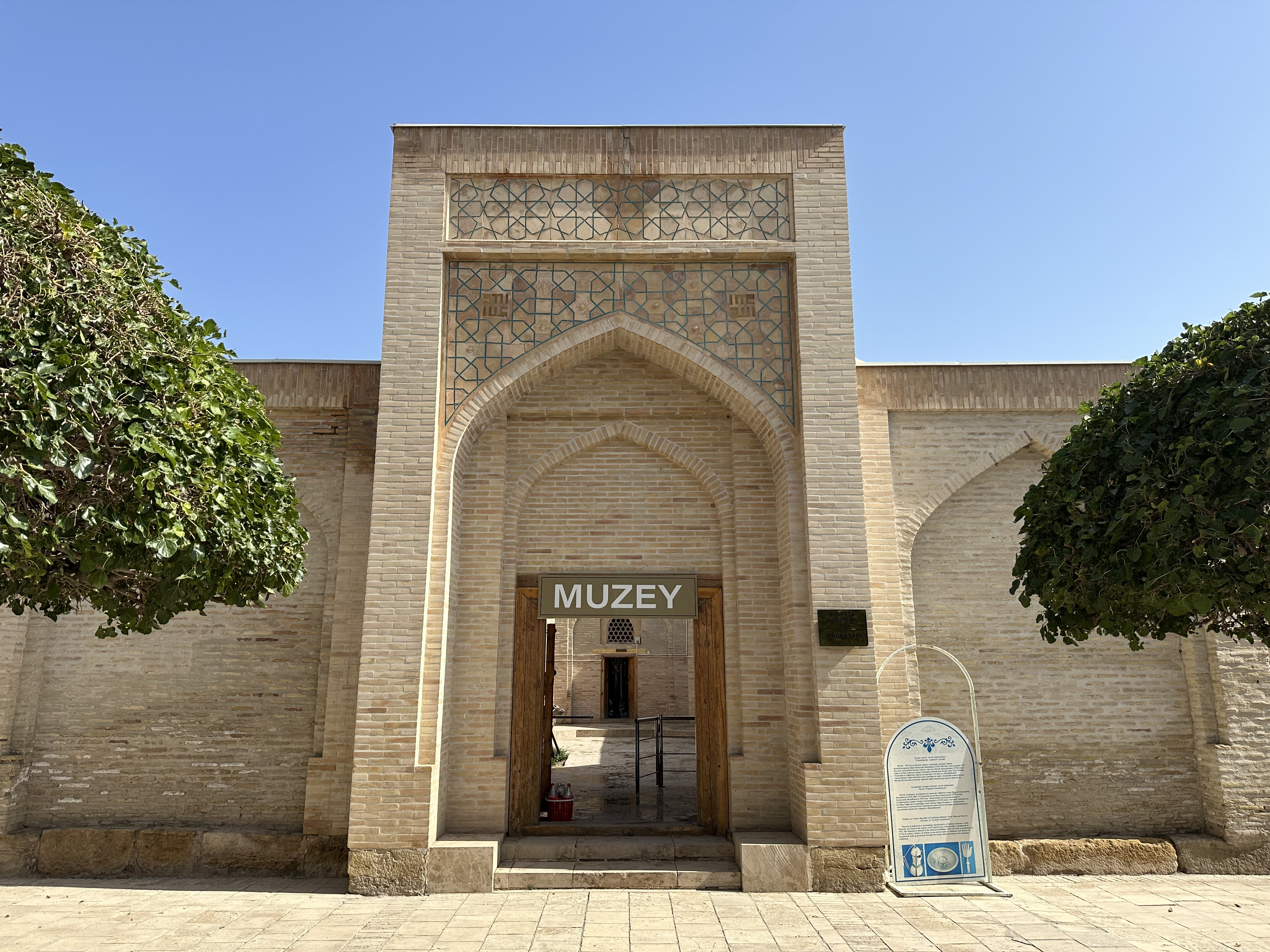

General information
- Status: State property.
- Type: Madrasah
- Architectural style: Central Asian architecture
- Location: Bukhara Region, Uzbekistan
- Opened: XVIII

Technical details
- Material: baked bricks

Daniyol Atalik Madrasah (Daniyolbi Madrasah) is an architectural monument. The one-story madrasah was built in the 1770s under the patronage of the Uzbek ruler Muhammad Daniyolbi. In the sources, it is also called Qorikhana. Bahauddin Naqshband was the second madrasah built after Mazari Sharif Higher Madrasah.

It is located in the Bahauddin Naqshband complex, Qasri Orifon village, Kogon district, Bukhara Region of Uzbekistan. Daniyol Atalik madrasah has come down to us in its entirety, it is included in the national list of immovable property objects of the material and cultural heritage of Uzbekistan under the name "Madrasah (Bahouddin Naqshband complex)" - it is under state protection.

The museum of the Naqshbandiyya order is operating in this madrasah, which has not been converted into a museum, the previous building was demolished and reorganized with trivial reasons.

== Architecture ==
The Daniyol paternal madrasah, built with a single floor made of baked bricks, has reached us intact. The inner courtyard of the madrasah is 8-cornered and consists of about 10 circular rooms. The entrance to the madrasah is through a domed miyansarai, and one can climb to the top of the miyansarai stairs. The doors of the madrasah are narrow and 2-layered, low. According to the traditions of Eastern culture, when a student comes to the door of the cell, he should bow his head and enter in a bowing position. First of all, this is respect for the teacher, the school of knowledge - the madrasah, and secondly, it always reminds the students of salam, the first sign of morality.

== Naqshbandiya tariqati museum ==
The Museum of Naqshbandiyya Tariqat was first established in 1993 on the occasion of the 675th anniversary of Bahauddin Naqshband in the Bukhara Museum-Reserve in the Bahauddin Naqshband Complex in a building specially built for the museum and the library of Naqshbandiyya Tariqat and built at a huge cost. Later, the museum and library building were demolished with trivial reasons. About 200 museum exhibits were transferred to the Donyolbi paternal madrasah, which was not built as a museum, and the museum exhibition was reorganized there. The library of the Naqshbandi sect was left without a shelter.

== Famous exhibits of the museum ==
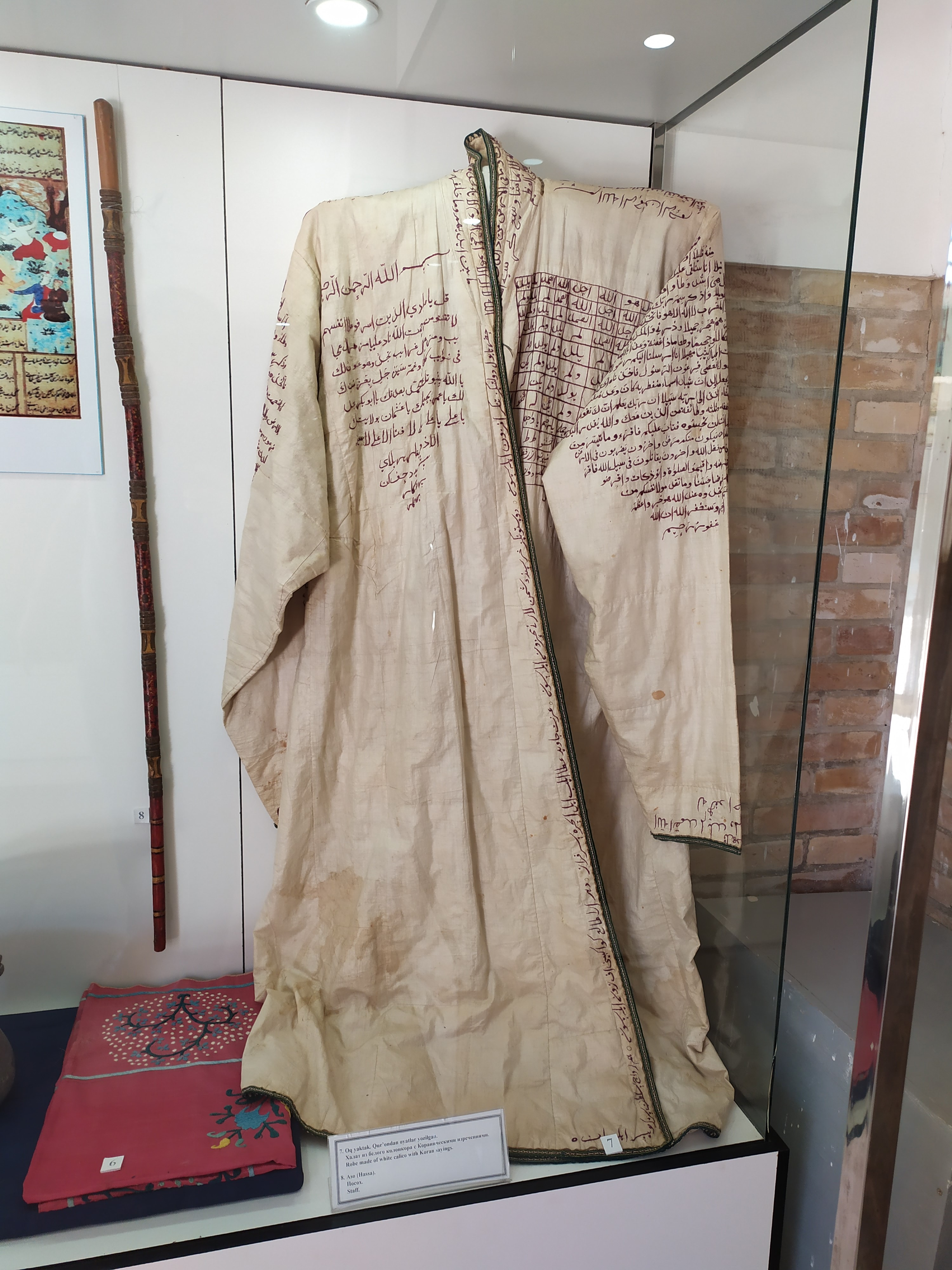
A white single with verses from the Kur'an

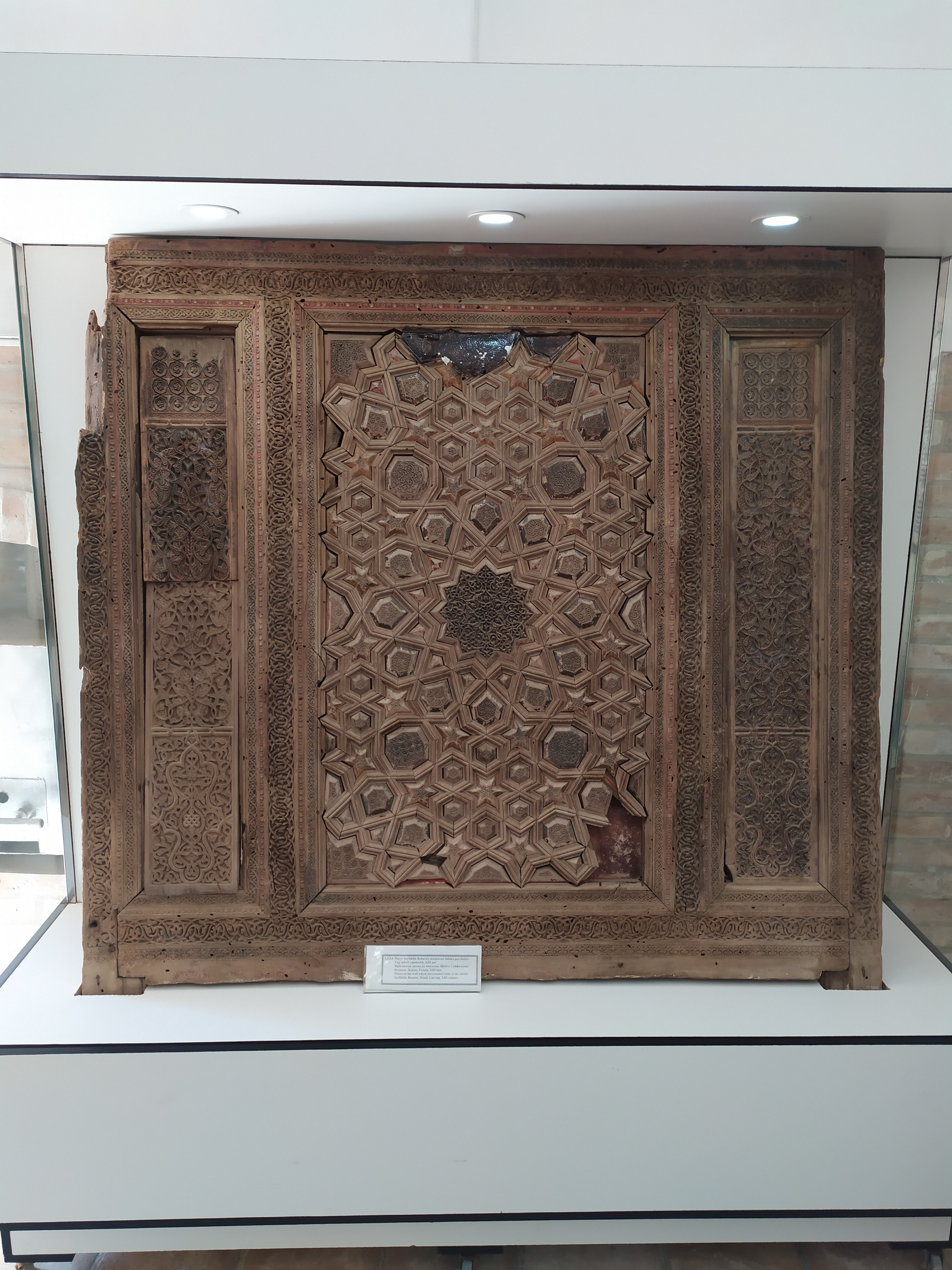
Sayfiddin Boharzi mausoleum fragments of a hut. Wood carving. XIII century

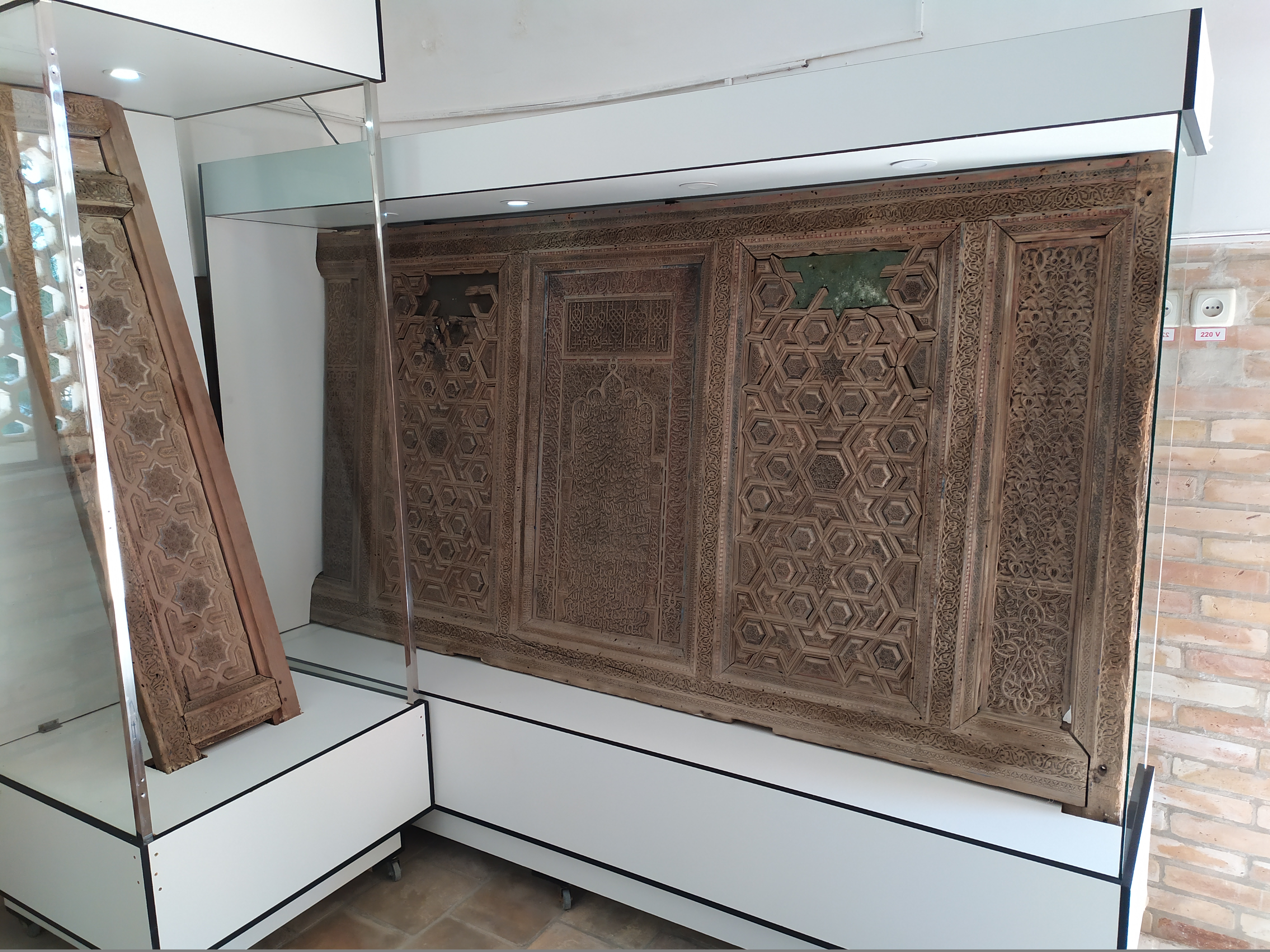
Sayfiddin Boharzi mausoleum fragments of a hut. Wood carving. XIII century

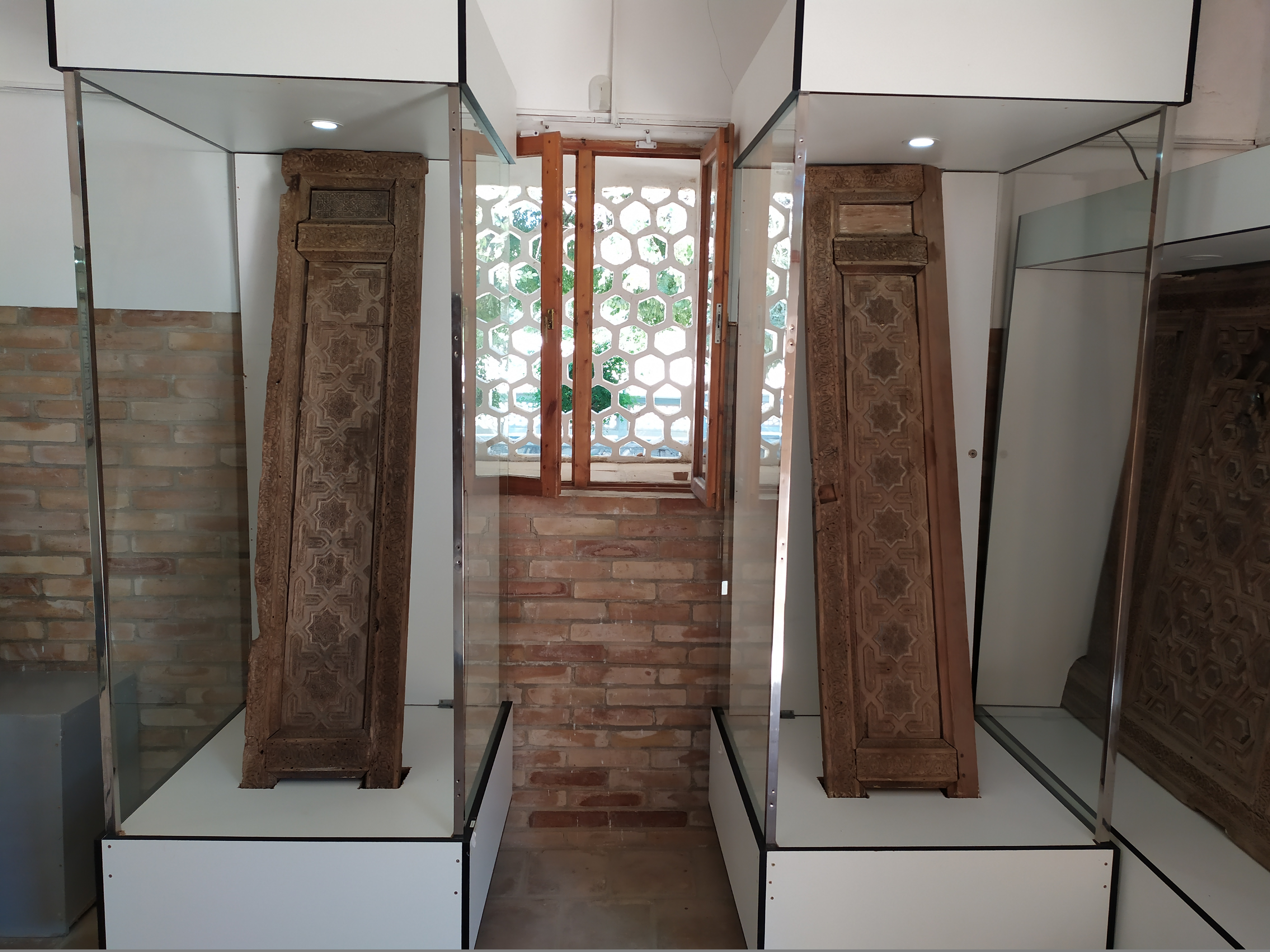
Sayfiddin Boharzi mausoleum fragments of a hut. Wood carving. XIII century

== See also ==
- Domulla Hasan Madrasah
- Govkushon Madrasah
- Chuqur Madrasah
- Boloyi hovuz Madrasah
- Khalifa Khudoidod Madrasah

== Literatures ==
- Jumanazar, Abdusattor (2017). Buxoro taʼlim tizimi tarixi [History of Bukhara's education system] (in Uzbek). Tashkent: Akademnashr.
- Yo'ldoshev, N.; Bobojonov, Sh. (2019). Bahouddin Naqshband tarixiy-me'moriy majmuasi [Bahauddin Naqshband historical-architectural complex] (in Uzbek). Tashkent: Navro'z. ISBN 978-9943-5655-8-6.
