= Khalifa Khudoidod Madrasah =

Madrasa in Bukhara, Uzbekistan

General information
- Architectural style: Central Asian Architecture
- Location: Bukhara, Uzbekistan
- Year built: 1796-1797

Technical details
- Material: brick, wood, stone, ganch

Khalifa Khudoidod Madrasah is an architectural monument located in Bukhara, Uzbekistan. It is included in the national list of real estate objects of material and cultural heritage of Uzbekistan. Khalifa Khudoidod madrasah was built by Khalifa Khudoidod in 1796-1797, during the reign of Amir Shah Murad, who ruled the Emirate of Bukhara.

== History ==
Five foundation documents related to Khalifa Khudoidad madrasa have been preserved. This waqf document contains information about the teachers who worked in the madrasa and the students who studied. Sadri Zia wrote that there were 36 rooms in this madrasa.

== See also ==
- Bibi Zuhra Madrasah
- Bibi Khalifa Madrasah
- A'lam madrasah
- Abduhafizboy Madrasah
