= Amir Muzaffarkhan Mosque =

Mosque in Kogon, Bukhara, Uzbekistan

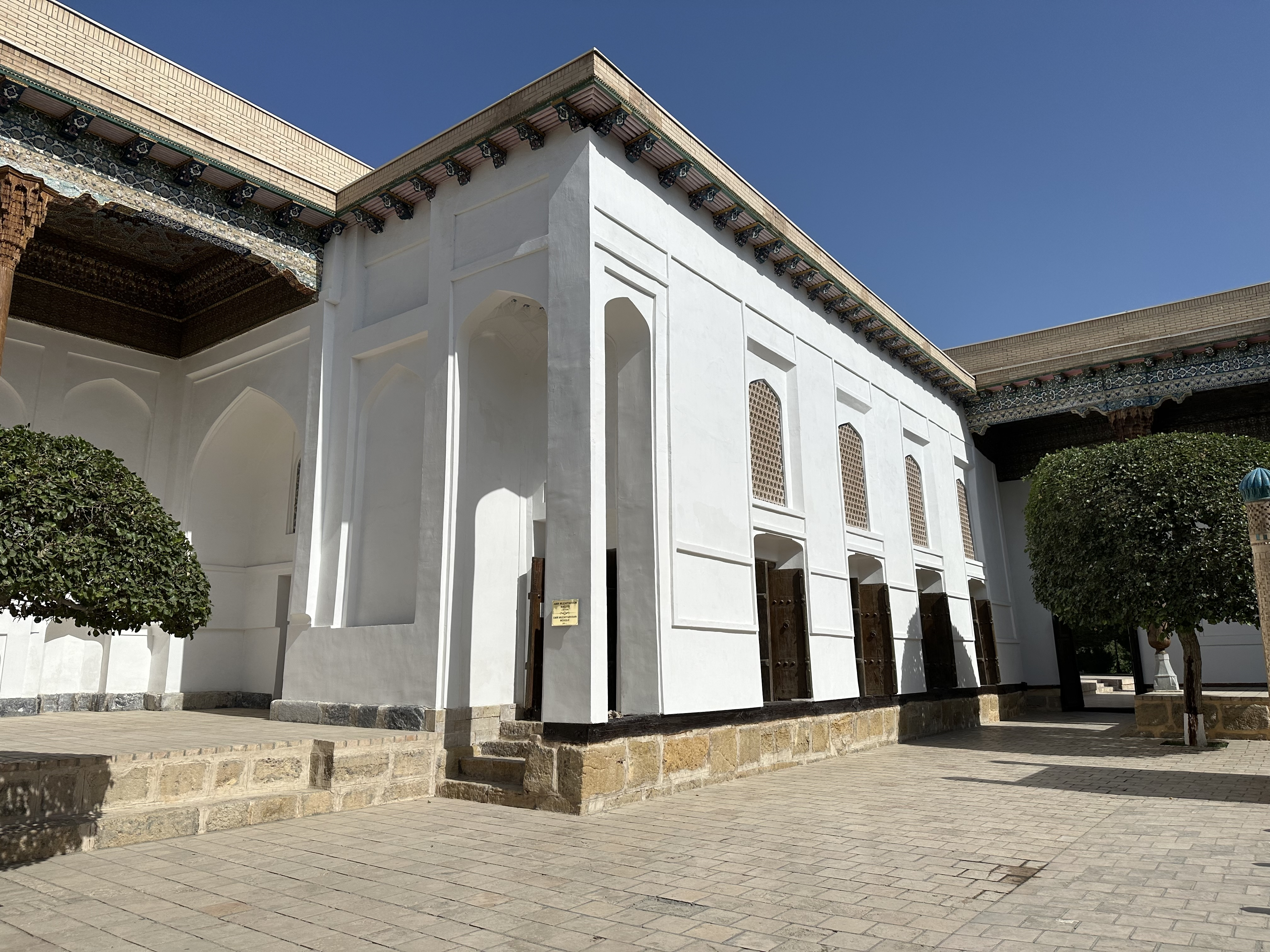
- Interactive map of the Amir Muzaffarkhan Mosque area

General information
- Architectural style: Central Asian architecture
- Location: Kogon District, Bukhara Region, Uzbekistan
- Year built: 19th century
- Demolished: 1940–1950 years
- Owner: Amir Muzaffar Khan

Technical details
- Material: brick, wood, stone and concrete

Design and construction
- Architects: Ahmed Bobomatov, Ochil Bobomurodov

Amir Muzaffarkhan Mosque is a mosque located in Bahoutdin Naqshband architectural complex, Kasri Orifon village, Kogon District, Bukhara Region, Uzbekistan. The mosque was built by Muzaffar bin Nasrullah (1860–1885), the representative of the Mangit dynasty that ruled Bukhara. The mosque is entered through the gate of Bab us-salam. The mosque is located in front of Bahoutdin Naqshband mosque.

== History ==
The architectural complex dates back to the 19th century and is surrounded by large stained-glass windows. During the reign of Amir Muzaffar Khan, he paid attention to both religious and secular affairs. Amir Muzaffar Khan left a will to his son 'Abd al-Ahad Khan: "I bequeath to you that you always be pious and diet. Follow the commandments of Islamic law and the Sunnah of the Messenger of Allah, peace be upon him. We are all those who are going from this mortal world to the next". The mosque has a porch on the outside and it consists of 5 pillars Large candlesticks, lanterns and ostrich eggs were hung in this mosque. Also, they were rotated in porch of the mosque by the force of the wind. The exterior of the building consists of glazed windows and 2 doors. The interior of the mosque has columns and a mihrab in the middle. But in 1940–1950 they were demolished. This situation can be seen in archive photos. During the years of Uzbekistan's independence (in 1991), the Amir Muzaffarkhan Mosque was renovated by builders led by Bukhara architects Ahmed Bobomatov and Ochil Bobomurodov. Gaybulla Barotov, Mubin Mominov, Naim Sharipov, Maqsud Mominov, Shavkat Mominov, Shakir Mominov took part in the renovation of the interior of the mosque. The mosque was built in the style of Central Asian architecture. Amir Muzaffarkhan mosque was built using brick, wood, stone and concrete.

== Literature ==
- Бобожонов, Ш (2017). Шариф шаҳар ёдгорликлари. Бухоро. p. 310.
- Йўлдошев Н.; Бобожонов Ш (2019). Баҳоуддин Нақшбанд тарихий меъморий мажмуаси. Тошкент: Наврўз нашриёти. p. 113.
