= Kasri Orifon (village) =

Ancient village of Uzbekistan

- village
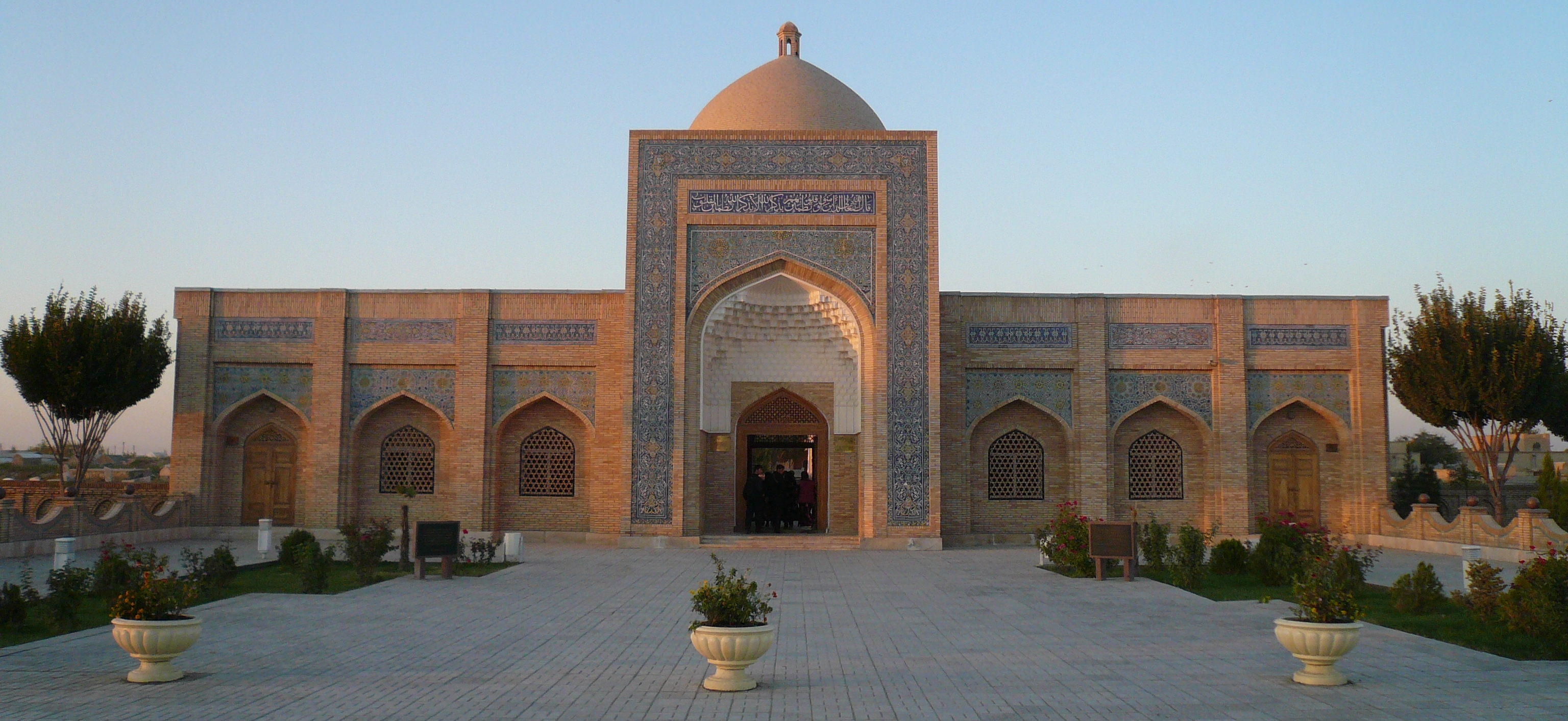
- Etymology: Kasri Hinduvon
- Interactive map of Kasri Orifon
- Coordinates: 39°48′00″N 64°32′13″E
- Country: Uzbekistan
- Region: Bukhara
- District: Kogon

Kasri Orifon (formerly known as Kasri Hinduvon) is one of the ancient villages of Uzbekistan. The settlement is located in Kogon district of Bukhara region. The village of Kasri Hinduvan was renamed as Kasri Orifon in honor of Bahauddin Naqshband, the founder of the Naqshbandi order in the 14th century.

== History ==
After the Bukhara revolution that took place in September 1920, in October of this year, the Bahauddin town of the Bukharan People's Soviet Republic was established in the territory of the current Kogon District, and the Kasri Orifon village was entered the territory of this town. On September 29, 1926, as a result of the implementation of administrative and economic zoning in the Uzbek SSR, Bahauddin district with the center as New Bukhara was formed in place of Bahauddin town. Later, the name of Bahauddin district was changed to New Bukhara, and in 1935, the name of the city of New Bukhara was changed to Kogon, so it was changed to Kogon district.

== Improvements ==
- In April 1928, the first school in Kogon District was built in Kasri Orifon. The school consisted of a hall and 3 classrooms. The donation money collected during the guli surkh election held at Bahauddin Naqshband Shrine was used for the construction of the school building. Odil Fazilov, Kuli Bozor, Kenja Kurbanov, Rozi Adizov, Tosh Madadov who lived in the village of Qasri Orifon took an active part in the construction of the school.
- In the years of the Second World War, orphanage No.5 was established in the building of the current village medical center of Kasri Orifon. During 1941–1950, orphans who were relocated from the war-torn regions were brought up here. After the number of children decreased, in 1950, its children were transferred to an orphanage in Bukhara.
- In 1944, the first central hospital of Kogon district was established as a 10-bed treatment department in an orphanage located in Kasri Orifon village. The hospital included 13 paramedics, midwifery stations, a sanitary-epidemiological station and "Tropical station" against malaria.
- In 1951, an asphalt road was built instead of the narrow road between Bukhara and Bahouddin Naqshband Shrine.
- In 1970, the Department of Culture and Sports of Kogon District was established in the Kasri Orifon village, which is still operating. The department includes 2 central culture houses, 2 folk ensembles (Go'zal singing and dancing ensemble, Kasri Orifon folklore-ethnographic ensemble) and several performance halls in other villages[.
- After the collapse of the Uzbek SSR and the independence of Uzbekistan, many events have been held in the village to commemorate the name of Bahauddin Naqshband.

== Architectural monuments ==
Bahauddin Naqshband Complex, Mir Arab Madrasa and other 30 state-protected architectural monuments are located in the village.

=== List of state-protected architectural monuments in Kasri Orifon village ===
Architectural monuments

Name	Period	Caption
Bibi Orifa mausoleum	XIV century	
Indoor pool (Bahoutdin Architectural Complex)	XIV century	
Raravi daroz	XIV century	
Cemetery (Bahoutdin Architectural Complex)	XIV century	
Huts of Timurids	XIV—XV century	
Hut of Bahauddin Naqshband	XVI century	
Bahouddin Naqshband mausoleum	XVI century	
Bobi Salom gate	XVI century	
Hut of Shaybanids (Bukhara)	XVI century	
Hut of Abdullah Khan II	XVI century	
Hut of Abdu'l-Aziz	XVI century	
Kasri Orifon mosque	XVI century	
Pool (Bibi Orifa mausoleum)	XVI century	
The bathroom (Bahoutdin Architectural Complex)	XVII century	
Dilovar Gate	XVIII century	
Toqi Miyona Gate	XVIII century	
Hut of Imam Quli Khan	XVIII century	
Hut of Ubaydullah Khan II	XVIII century	
Hut of Subhan Quli Khan	XVIII century	
Hut of Podsho Oyim	XVIII century	
Doniyolbiy madrasah	XVIII century	
Remains of Madrasa (Bahoutdin Architectural Complex)	XVIII century	
Remains of Xonaqo(Bahoutdin Architectural Complex)	XVIII century	
Outdoor Pool(Bahoutdin Architectural Complex)	XVIII century	
Hakim qoʻshbegi Mosque	XIX century	
Minora (Bahoutdin Architectural Complex)	XIX century	
Minora (Bibi Orifa mausoleum)	XIX century	
Amir Muzaffarkhan Mosque	XIX century	
Islam Gate	2003	
New Porch (Bahoutdin Architectural Complex)	2003	

== Literature ==
- Rajabov, Q.; Jamolova, D. (2012). Kogon tumani tarixi \lang=uz [History of Kogon district]. Toshkent: Tafakkur.
