= Kasri Orifon Minaret =

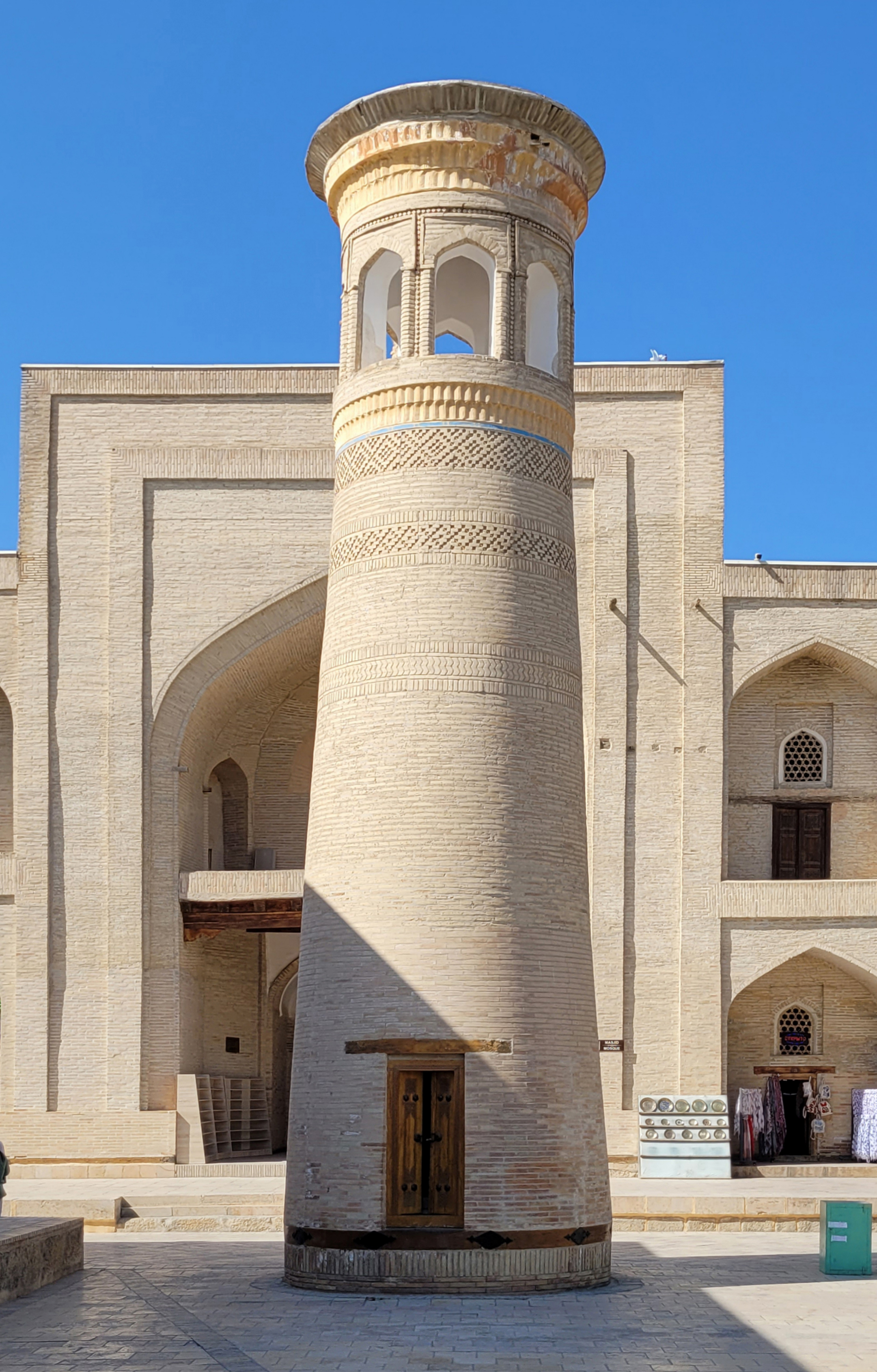
- Interactive map of the Kasri Orifon Minaret area

General information
- Architectural style: Central Asian architecture
- Location: Kogon District, Bukhara Khanate, Uzbekistan
- Coordinates: 39°48′06″N 64°32′14″E
- Year built: 18th century

Technical details
- Material: brick, wood, concrete

Kasri Orifon Minaret is a minaret in Bahoutdin Architectural Complex, Kasri Orifon village, Bukhara Khanate, Kogon District.

The minaret was built in 1718-1720 during the reign of the Ashtarkhanid dynasty ruler Abu al-Fayz Khan. The minaret is included in the national list of immovable property objects of material and cultural heritage of Uzbekistan. On the backside of the minaret are Abdulaziz Khan's house, on the right side is the Abdul Hakim Koshbegi Mosque, and on the left side is the Naqshbandiya Tariqat Museum. The height of the minaret is 12.2 metres (40 ft) and the diameter is 3 metres (9.8 ft). The upper part is octagonal, and it is noted that it was built between 1718 and 1720. The lower part of the minaret is made of mulberry wood and raised with bricks. The upper part of the chinch is decorated with decorative flowers. On the qibla side of the minaret, the year 1885 "Aqibat Khayrobod" i.e. "Aqibat Khayrabod 1885" is written in the nastaq letter. The same inscriptions were written four times in suls script on the porch of the Bibi Orifa complex in the Bahoutdin Architectural Complex. The phrase "May the end be good" has three meanings: to finish the work started with good, to say goodbye to the person and this world, and to take into account his deeds on the Day of Resurrection. In 2005, the minaret was repaired Because the east side of the minaret deviated by 41 centimetres (16 in). The western side was reinforced with iron bands. The decoration on the surface of the minaret has been renovated. Muzaffar Mirzayev led the repair of the minaret. The minaret was built in the style of Central Asian architecture. Brick, wood, stone, and concrete were used in the construction of Kasri Orifon minaret.

== See also ==
- Bahoutdin Architectural Complex
- Kasri Orifon

== Literatures ==
- Каримова Г., лойиҳа муаллифи, таржима ва изоҳлар муҳаррирлари Б. Бобожонов, К. Рахимов (2011). Ўзбекистон обидаларидаги битиклар. Тошкент: Ўзбекистон нашриёти. p. 564. ISBN 978-9943-01-716-0.
- Йўлдошев Н., Бобожонов Ш (2019). Баҳоуддин Нақшбанд тарихий меъморий мажмуаси. Тошкент: Наврўз нашриёти. p. 113.
