= Abd al-Shakur-i Ayat =

Abd al-Shakur-i Ayat (Persian: عبد الشکورِ آیت: 1817/18–1889) was a qazi (religious judge) in the Emirate of Bukhara. From 1879 until his death, he served as the qazi kalan (chief justice) of the entire emirate. He was the father of Sadr-i Ziya, and grandfather of Muhammadjon Shakuri.

== Sources ==
- Allworth, Edward A. (2003). The Personal History of a Bukharan Intellectual: The Diary of Muḥammad Sharīf-i Ṣadr-i Ziyā. Brill Publishers. ISBN 978-9004131613.
