= Abduhafizboy Madrasah =

Madrasa in Bukhara, Uzbekistan

- Adbuhafizboy Madrasasi
- Interactive map of the Abduhafizboy Madrasah area
- Alternative names: Abdulhafizboy Madrasah, Hotam Hindu Madrasah, Hotam Hundi Madrasah

General information
- Status: under the protection of the state
- Type: Madrasah
- Architectural style: Central Asian architecture
- Location: Hamid Olimjon MFY, Sozangaron Street, Bukhara Region, Uzbekistan
- Coordinates: 39°46′22.43093″N 64°24′55.72044″E
- Construction started: 1910
- Owner: State property. Bukhara Region Cultural Heritage Department on the basis of operational management rights

Technical details
- Material: baked bricks
- Floor count: 2 floors

Design and construction
- Architect: Abdumajid's son Abduhafiz Bukhari

Abduhafizboy Madrasah (Abdulhafizboy Madrasah, Hotam Hindu Madrasah, Hotam Hundi Madrasah) is a two-story madrasah located in the historical center of the city of Bukhara in the Bukhara Region, Republic of Uzbekistan. It is included in the national list of real estate objects of material and cultural heritage of Uzbekistan. The madrasah is named Abduhafizboy (Abdulhafizboy) in historical and foundation documents. Currently, it is registered under the names Hotam Hindu or Hotam Hundi in the official documents of the state. Despite the allocation of funds under the 2010 state program for the restoration and repair of the madrasah, it remains in a deplorable state.

== History ==
The madrasah was built in 1910 in Sozangaron, the capital of Bukhara Emirate, during the reign of the Uzbek ruler Abdulahad Khan (1885-1910) with the funds of Abdumajid's son Abduhafiz Bukhari.

According to the State program developed in 2010, it planned to research the madrasah in 2013, break it into pieces, clean it, structurally strengthen it, restore it, restore it, and conserve it. Despite the fact that 30 million soums were allocated for these works, the building is in a deplorable condition.

The madrasah, as an architectural monument of the city of Bukhara, was included in the national list of immovable property objects of the material and cultural heritage of Uzbekistan approved in 2019.

According to 2020 data, the investor presented a project to preserve the integrity of the madrasah, improve its condition, restore it and turn it into an attractive object for tourists. A preliminary project on the establishment of a tourist service facility on the basis of the madrasah was prepared and presented to the Scientific-Expert Council under the Department of Cultural Heritage of Uzbekistan.

The madrasah belongs to Hamid Olimjon MFY, Sozangaron Street, Bukhara.

== Architecture ==
The madrasah is made of baked brick and has two floors.

== See also ==
- Khoja Kurban Madrasah
- Abdullakhan Madrasah (Bukhara)
- Abdullah Katib Madrasah
