= Layeq Sherali =

Tajikistani poet (1941–2000)

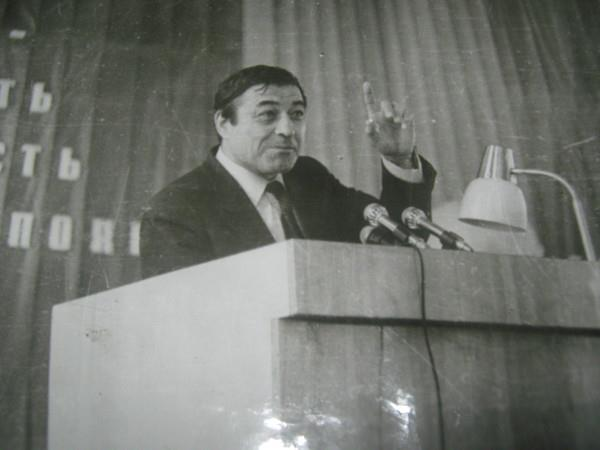
- Native name: Лоиқ Шералӣ
- Born: 20 May 1941 Mazar-i Sharif, Panjakent, Tajik SSR, USSR
- Died: 30 June 2000 (aged 59) Dushanbe, Tajikistan
- Occupation: Poet

Lāyiq Shēralī (Tajik: Лоиқ Шералӣ) was a Tajik poet, Iranologist and one of the most celebrated Persian literary figures of Tajikistan and Central Asia.

Lāyiq Shēralī had expertise in classical Persian poetry. The influence of Firdowsi, Khayyam and Molana Jalaleddin-e Balkhi is evident in Shir-Ali's works. He also translated several literary master pieces into Persian.

He was the head of the Tajik-Persian Language International Foundation in Middle Asia and he was called as Shah-Poet of Tajikistan. A chosen collection of his works is published in Iran, 1994. Another collection, "Rakh's Spirit" is published in Iran, in 1999, by Mirzo Shakurzoda.

== Poetry ==
An excerpt from one of Sher-Ali's most famous poems, about three years before his death:

یکی گفتی تو ایرانی، دیگر گفتی تو تاجیکی
Яке гуфтӣ ту эронӣ, дигар гуфтӣ ту тоҷикӣ
جدا از اصل خود میرد کسی مارا جدا کردست
Ҷудо аз асли худ мирад касе моро ҷудо кардаст

English:
Once you said "You're Iranian," then you said "You are Tajik"
May he die separated from his own origin, who has separated us

== See also ==
- Persian literature
- Persian culture
- Greater Iran
- Mohammad Jan Shakouri
