= Muhammad Ali hoji Madrasa =

Madrasa in Bukhara, Uzbekistan

General information
- Architectural style: Central Asian
- Location: Qosh madrasa quarter, Bukhara
- Year built: 1707-1708
- Owner: Muhammad Ali hoji, one of the emirs of Bukhara Khan Subhonqulikhan

Technical details
- Material: baked brick, wood, stone and gypsum
- Floor count: 2

The Muhammad Ali hoji Madrasa was a madrasa located in Bukhara in present-day Uzbekistan. The madrasa has not been preserved until today.

== History ==
Muhammad Ali hoji Madrasa was founded in 1707–1708 in Qosh madrasa quarter, during the reign of Ubaydullakhan of Ashtarkhanids, the ruler of the Bukhara Khanate, by Muhammad Ali hoji, one of the emirs of Bukhara Khan Subhonqulikhan. He taught as a third-degree senior mudarris (teacher) at the madrasa. According to Abdurauf Fitrat, the annual waqf amount given to the madrasa was 150,000 tangas.

Muhammad Ali hoji Madrasa was one of the most famous madrasas in Bukhara. The annual salary of the mudarris who worked at this madrasa was 85-90 tillas. More than five waqf documents related to the activities of the madrasa have been preserved. A decree of Bukhara Amir Amir Muzaffarkhan issued in August 1875 states that qazi askar domulla Khodjakalon taught half a share at Muhammad Alikhan Madrasa.

== Architecture ==
Muhammad Ali hoji Madrasa consisted of 19 rooms (17 according to Sadri Ziyo). Two students lived in each room. The madrasa was built in the style of Central Asian architecture, and was made of baked brick, wood, stone and gypsum.

== See also ==
- Ismoilxoja Madrasa
- Shirgaron Madrasa
- Abdushukurboy Madrasa
- Ikromkhoja Madrasa
