= Kogon, Uzbekistan =

Kogon Uzbek: Kogon
- City
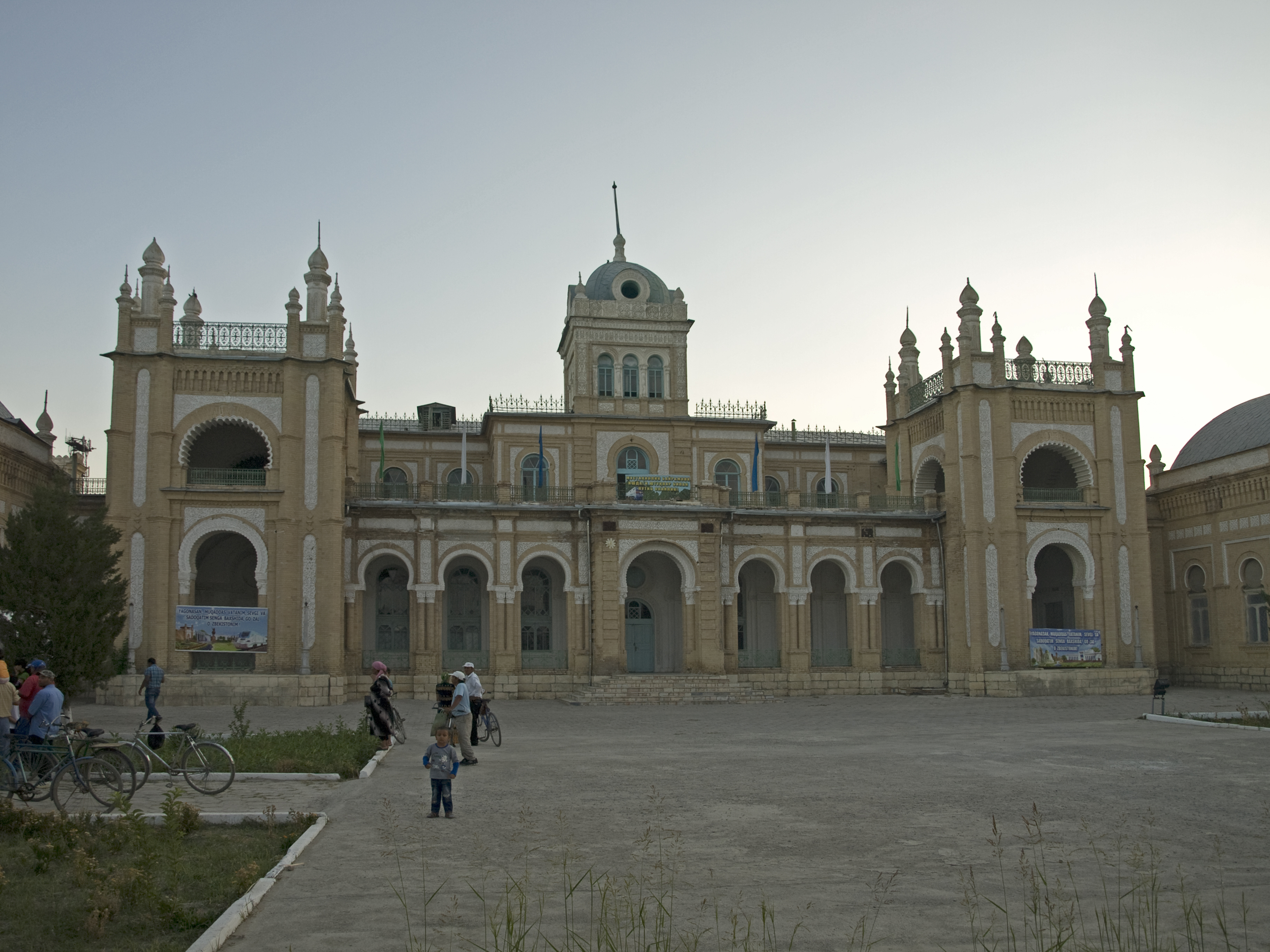
- Travel Palace

- Location in Uzbekistan
- Coordinates: 39°43′N 64°33′E
- Country: Uzbekistan
- Region: Bukhara Region
- Town status: 1929

Area
  - Total: 20 km^{2} (7.7 sq mi)

Population (2021)
  - Total: 62,300
  - Density: 3,100/km^{2} (8,100/sq mi)
- Time zone: UTC+5 (UZT)

Kogon (Uzbek: Kogon; Tajik: Когон; until 1935 Uzbek: Yangi Buxoro) is a district-level city in Bukhara Region in Uzbekistan. It is also the seat of Kogon District, but not part of it.

== History ==
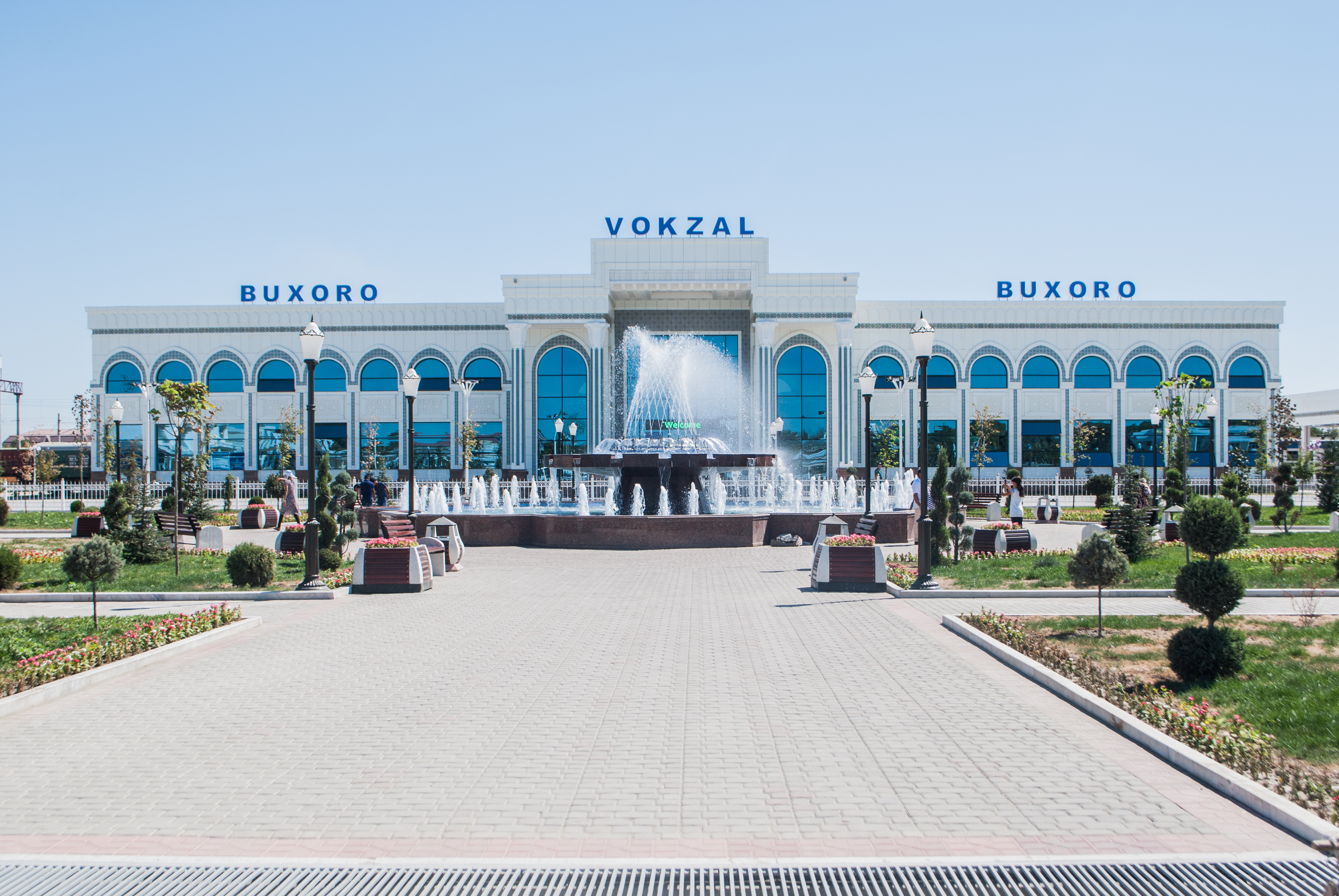
Train Station "Bukhara-1"

The city was named Yangi Buxoro (New Bukhara) until 1935.

The city has a railway station, Bukhara-1, serving the city of Bukhara, which is located 12 km from Kogon. In 1990 construction of long-distance trolleybus line Bukhara – Kogon started, but later it was discontinued.

The Russian Empire sought to connect new lands with the center of the empire with modern trade routes faster. The most perfect solution to this problem was the construction of railroads.

Kogon was founded as the Russian settlement New Bukhara for railroad workers.

Built in 1888 in 12 kilometers from Bukhara to serve stations and tracks on the Trans-Caspian railway, the settlement eventually became a kind of embassy town.

In those days, land plots for the construction of residential houses were sold from the Bukhara government at a price of about 50 kopecks (3 Bukhara tenge) per square fathom.

In addition to residential houses of the railroad employees, it housed a special institution managing diplomatic relations between the Russian Empire and the Bukhara Emirate.

In 1890 there were already several transportation offices, several stores and postal and telegraph office.

In 1892 an orthodox church was established, a parish school was opened and a magistrate's court was founded. In 1894 was opened a branch of the State Bank, and then a customs house.

On August 14, 1895, by order of Emir Said Abd al-Ahad Khan, construction of a new palace began in connection with the expected visit of the Russian Emperor to Turkestan.

The palace was designed by Alexey Leontievich Benois. The construction was completed in 1898 by Bukharan and Russian craftsmen under the guidance of engineer Dubrovin. In 1910 the Kogon butter factory started its activity.

In the years of establishment of Soviet power in Central Asia and Turkestan Kogon was in the center of stormy revolutionary events.

Commander of the Turkestan Front Mikhail Frunze attached great importance to the Kogon garrison units in the operation to liquidate the Bukhara Emirate.

They were entrusted with the capture of Bukhara, where the main enemy forces were concentrated. Kogon group went on the offensive on August 29, 1920 and fulfilled the task.

The settlement, located in the Kogon area at an altitude of 235 meters above sea level, soon became a town of European type.

Since 1935, New Bukhara has been called Kogon.

Separate helicopter regiment

In Soviet times, a separate helicopter regiment was based in Kogon. The history of the Kogon air garrison began in 1958, when an air regiment of Li-2 transport planes was redeployed to Kogon from Transbaikal.

In the same year, the regiment's personnel were retrained on Mi-4 helicopters and began to be called the 280th Independent Helicopter Regiment. In 1973, the Kogon Helicopter Regiment began retraining flight crews to fly Mi-8T helicopters.

In the early 70s, the Cosmonaut Training Center conducted experiments on desert survival in the sands of the Kyzylkum Desert. The methodology and practice of survival in extreme conditions were developed.

In mid-July 1978, the Cosmonaut Training Center conducted its first training in the desert near Bukhara. From Khanabad Air Base, the cosmonauts were transported by Mi-6 helicopter of the Kogon Helicopter Regiment to the city of Kogon.

There is a place called "Saydak Well" in the sands 40 km from Kogon. This is where the brigade that conducted the experiments was located.

In 1978, a group of young cosmonauts who were in training in Kogon were led by cosmonaut Vasily Lazarev.

During the entry of the limited contingent of Soviet troops into Afghanistan, helicopters of the Kogon 280th separate helicopter regiment provided the transfer of the paratroop regiment.

Since August 1979, the 4th helicopter squadron of the 280th separate helicopter regiment was stationed at Bagram Airfield, which was to provide the work of Soviet military advisers who were in Afghanistan.

Lieutenant colonel A. Belov took direct command of the squadron. By the spring of 1980, the situation in the Democratic Republic of Afghanistan has not stabilized and it was decided to additional saturation of the 40th Army helicopter units.

On April 11, 1980 280th Independent Helicopter Regiment in full force was redeployed to Kandahar airfield. Together with the regiment was introduced and the 475th Independent Battalion of airfield maintenance.

In 1981, the personnel of the 280th Independent Helicopter Regiment on the replacement returned to Kogon airfield, where the process of forming the 162nd Independent Combat Transport Helicopter Regiment began.

The 162nd Independent Combat Transport Helicopter Regiment had to solve a very important task of training crews preparing to be sent to the war in Afghanistan. A special "Relay Race" program was developed for this purpose.

One of the stages of the "Relay Race" took place at airfields in Central Asia (in Chirchiq and Kogon). Here the crews flew in geographical and climatic conditions, as close as possible to the conditions of Afghanistan.

On the basis of 2 regiments (Kogon and Chirchiq) a Flight Training Center was organized. Pilots from different regions and military districts came to the regiment to undergo mountain and desert training.

Such training was essential. In 1988, the withdrawal of equipment from the territory of the Republic of Afghanistan to Kogon Air Base began.

There was no need for the Flight Training Center, and, according to official data, on December 29, 1988, the 162nd Independent Combat Transport Helicopter Regiment ceased to exist.

Until July 1990, helicopter units were withdrawn from Afghanistan to Kogon airfield for disbandment.

In early July 1990 in Kogon permanently stationed there withdrawn from Hungary (Kalocsa) 396th Independent Volgograd Guards Helicopter Regiment of the Order of the Red Star.

In 1991 at the airfield filmed some episodes of the movie "To Survive" with the participation of Vladimir Menshov and Alexander Rosenbaum. After the collapse of the USSR, the regiment was transferred to the Armed Forces of Uzbekistan.

== Population ==
The town population in 1989 was 48,054. It has an area of 20 km^{2} (7.7 sq mi).

== Economy ==
On May 23, 1961, by order of the leadership of the Main Directorate of the Gas Industry under the Council of Ministers of the USSR, Directive No. 123 was established in the city for the Bukhara-Ural gas pipeline and launched in 1966.

Located 40 kilometers from Kagan is the Kagan Gas Field Group, consisting of four areas: Sary-Tash, Karaul-Bazar, Jarkak, and Setalan-Tepe. There are also oil and fat processing plants as well as cotton cleaning factories. On May 16, 2011, the opening of the KNAUF Gypsum Bukhara factory for the production of KNAUF boards took place.

== Education ==
In 1902, the 1st Tatar school was opened in New Bukhara.

== Religion ==
The city has 2 Sunni mosques (Alisher Navoi and Shom) and 1 Shiite mosque (Zirabad) "Abdullah bin Mubarak" mosque, 1 Orthodox church of Saint Nicholas the Wonderworker, and a former synagogue building.

== Transport ==
At the beginning of the 20th century, a narrow-gauge railway was constructed between Bukhara and New Bukhara (Kagan) using funds provided by the Emir of Bukhara. In 1922, the railway station in Kagan was renamed Bukhara I and the terminal station located 12 kilometers from Kagan (in the city of Bukhara itself) became known as Bukhara II. Between the stations Bukhara I and Bukhara II, a suburban train operated under the colloquial name "Bukharka" until the 1960s. Since the 1960s, only freight transportation has been available in this section (passenger service briefly resumed in 1994). In 1990, construction began on an intercity trolleybus line from Bukhara to Kagan, but later the construction was put on hold and never resumed.

== Gallery ==
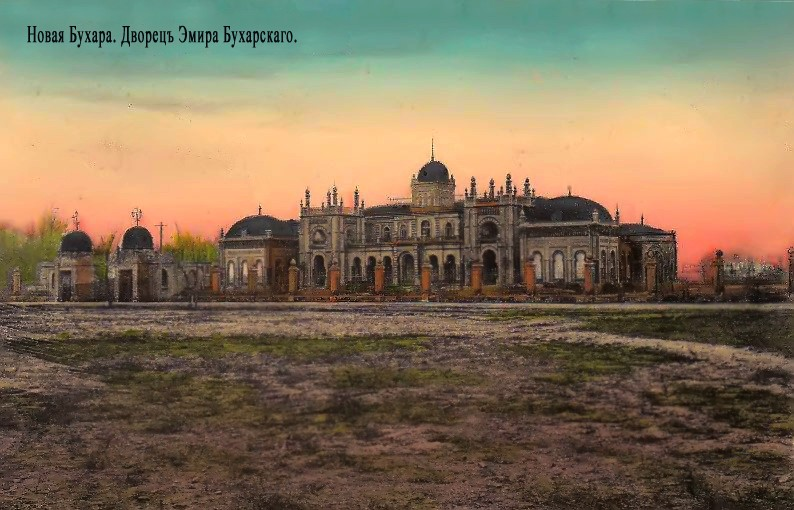
Palace of the Emir of Bukhara. 19th century

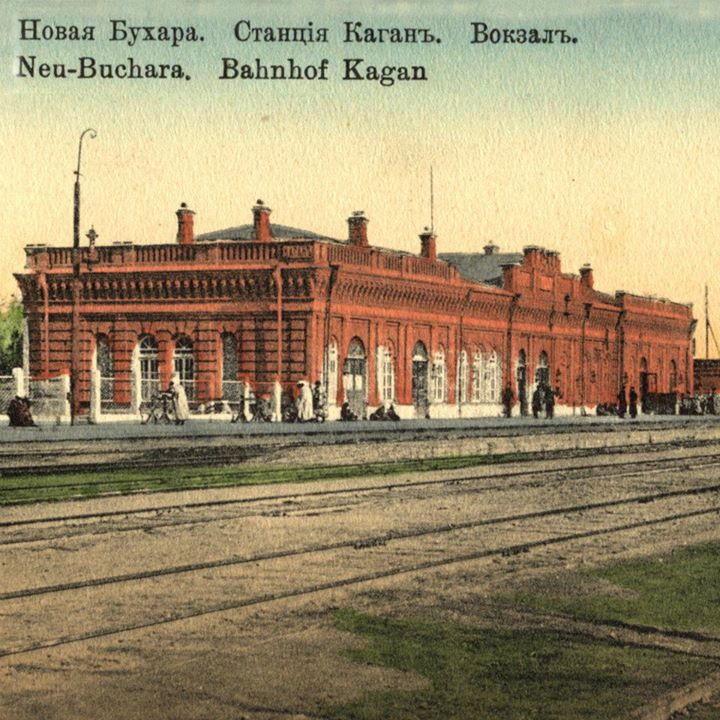
Old station building. 19th century

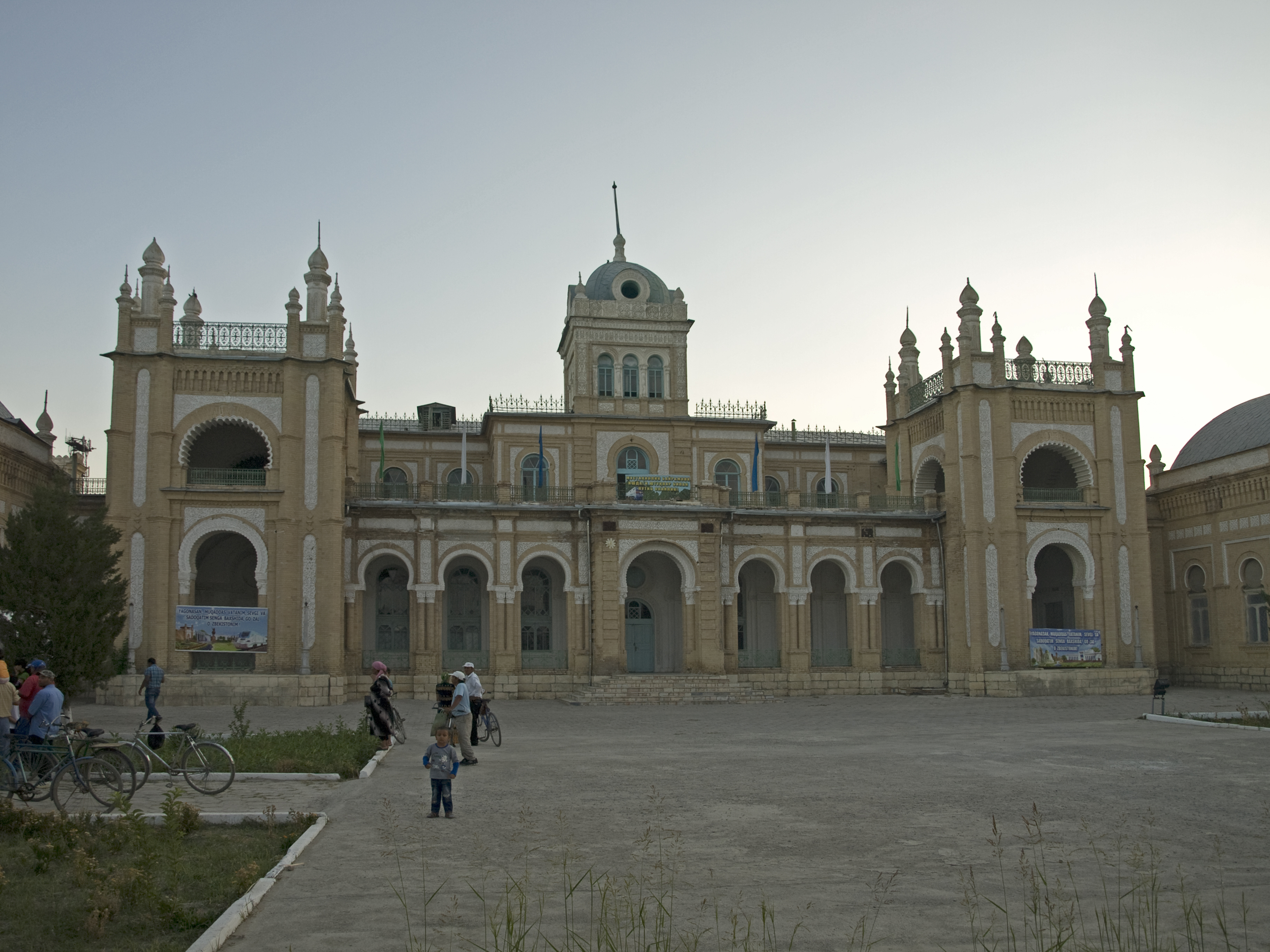
Palace of the Emir of Bukhara. 2015

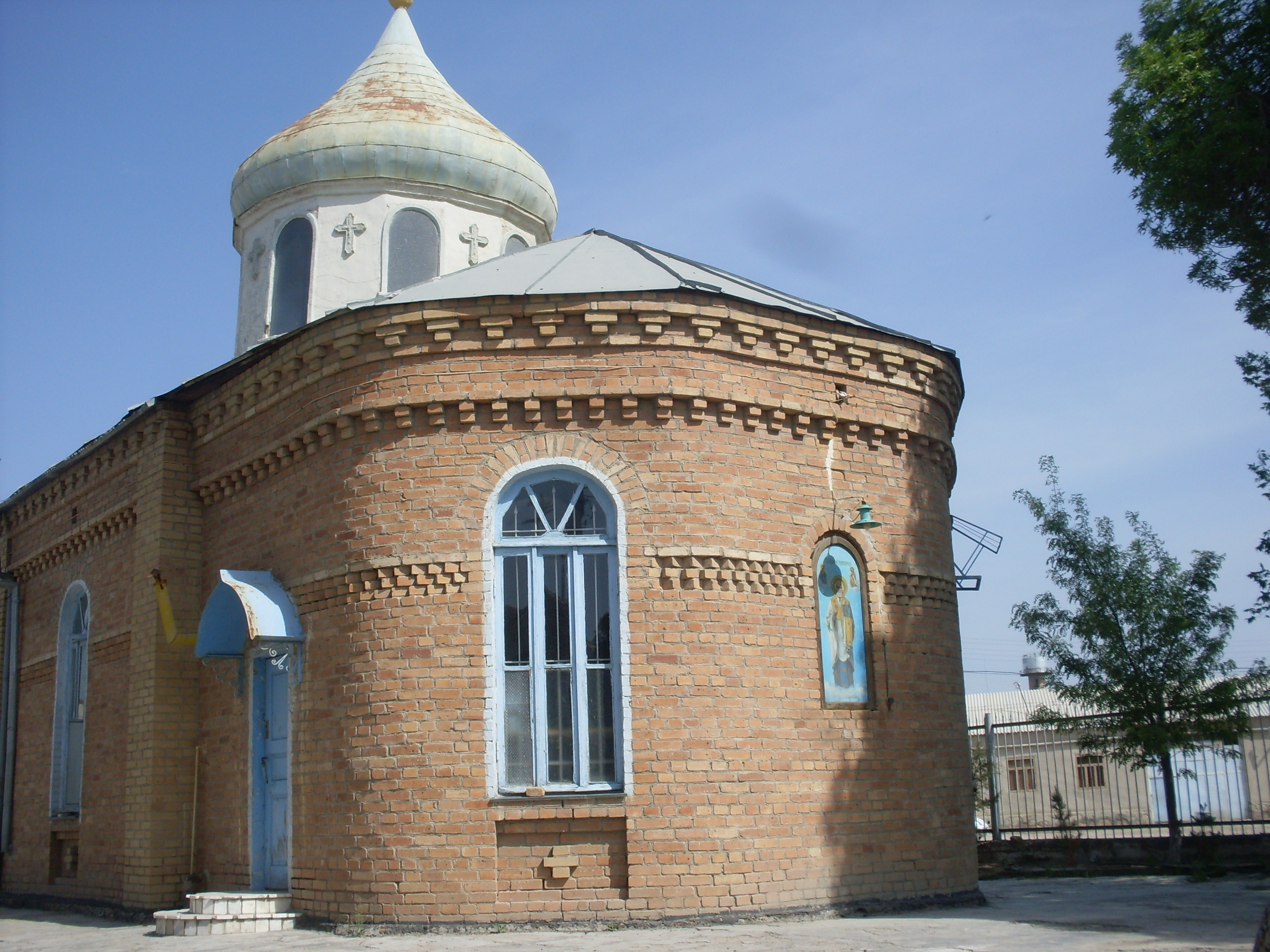
New station building. 2016
