= Muhammadjon Shakuri =

- Муҳаммадҷон Шакурӣ
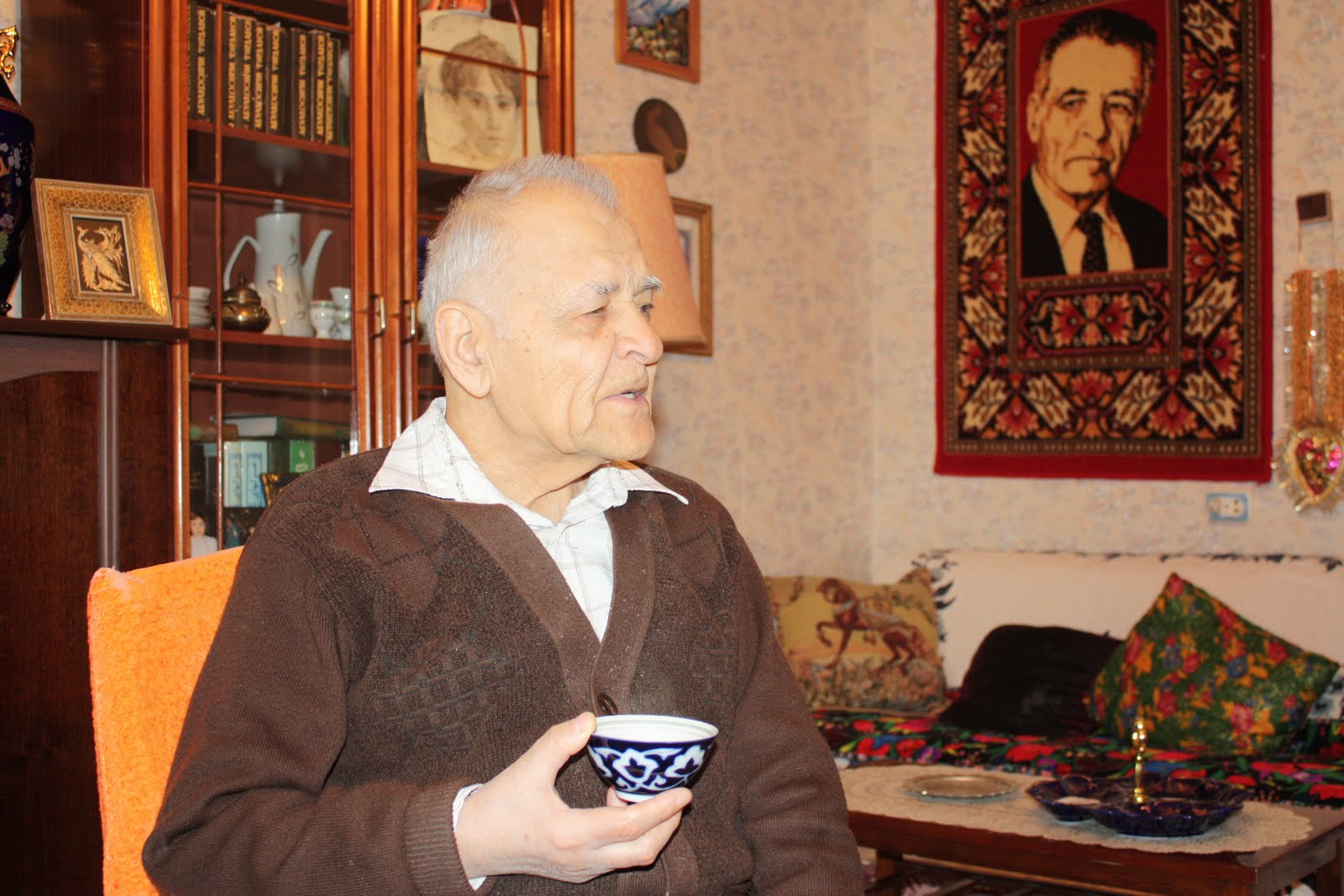

Personal details
- Born: approximately 29 October 1925 Bukhara, Uzbek SSR, USSR
- Died: 16 September 2012 Dushanbe, Tajikistan
- Parent: Sadr-i Ziya (father)
- Profession: Writer; Linguist

Muhammadjon Shakuri (Tajik: Муҳаммадҷон Шакурӣ, Persian: محمدجان شکوری), also known as Muhammad Sharifovich Shukurov, was a prominent Tajik intellectual and one of the notable literary figures of the Persian language of the 20th century. From the late 1980s, during glasnost, he cultivated an interest in the theory of modern Tajik culture, and he published copiously on the issues of the history and contemporary conditions of the Tajik language, literature, and culture during the independence period after 1991.

Among his main works is a Tajiki-Persian dictionary. He also had a significant role in preserving Tajik identity.

== Awards and honors ==
- Iran's Eternal Figure Award (2005)
- Permanent member of Academy of Persian Language and Literature (1996)
- Permanent member of Tajik Academy of Sciences

== See also ==
- Iranistics
- Loiq Sherali
- Gulrukhsor Safieva
