= Bibi Zuhra Madrasah =

Madrasa in Bukhara, Uzbekistan

Bibi Zuhra madrasah
- Bibi Zuhra madrasasi

General information
- Status: State property.
- Type: Madrasah
- Architectural style: Central Asian architecture
- Location: Bukhara Region, Uzbekistan
- Opened: Eighteenth century

Technical details
- Material: baked bricks
- Size: 5 cells

Bibi Zuhra madrasah is located in Bukhara. The madrasah has not been preserved today. Bibi Zuhra madrasah was built by Bibi Zuhra at the end of the 18th century in the guzar of the Volidai Khan Mosque, during the reign of Amir Shahmurad, who ruled the Bukhara Emirate. Research scientist Abdusattor Jumanazarov studied a number of foundation documents related to this madrasah and provided information related to the madrasah. The letter of foundation of the madrasah was written in Persian in the month of Jumad ul-Awwal 1214 AH (October 1799) during the reign of Amir Shahmurad. The following information is written in this foundation document: "Eshon Muzaffarkhoja, who fell ill and died, was represented by the wife of Eshon Naqib, Bibi Zuhra Oyim Ollayor, daughter of Eshon Shafi'khoja, Sadr Valadi Eshan Umarkhoja." In the document, two-thirds of 50 square meters of land in the village of Halvogaron in Kamot district were endowed for the endowment of the madrasah. To the west of the Bibi Zuhra madrasah, there was a porch of the Volidai Khan mosque and a yard of Turki Adilshah, a yard to the north and east, and a mosque road to the south. 2 students lived in madrasah rooms. The madrasah was endowed by the foundation itself. When he died, his brother Lutfullahhoja and his descendants fulfilled this task. This foundation document was confirmed by the seals of Amir Shahmurad, Qazi ul-Quzzat Muhammad Alim ibn Muhammad Ya'qub, Qazi Mir Abdullah and a number of other persons.
