= Domulla Hasan Madrasah =

Madrasa in Bukhara, Uzbekistan

Domulla Hasan madrasah
- Domulla Hasan madrasasi
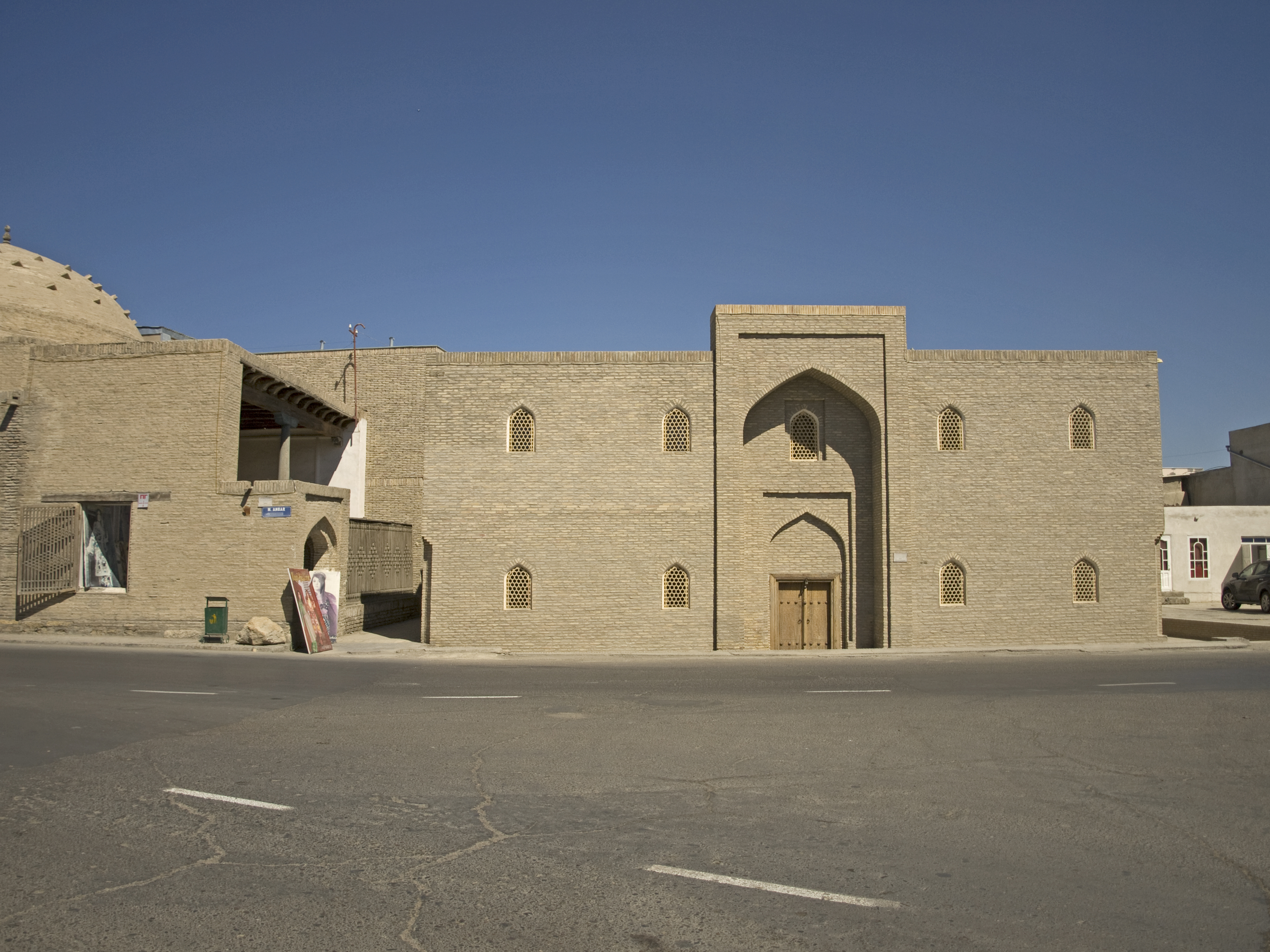
- Interactive map of the Domulla Hasan madrasah area
- Alternative names: Domullo Hasan madrasah, Bozori alaf madrasah

General information
- Status: under the protection of the state
- Type: Madrasah
- Architectural style: Central Asian architecture
- Location: Koʻkaldosh MFY, Mehtar Anbar Street, Bukhara Region, Uzbekistan
- Coordinates: 39°46′25″N 64°25′21″E
- Opened: XIX
- Owner: State property. Bukhara Region Cultural Heritage Department on the basis of operational management rights
- Affiliation: Hasan Akhund ibn Khal az-Zarir al-Bukhari

Technical details
- Material: baked bricks
- Size: 23 cells
- Floor count: two-storey

Domulla Hasan madrasah (Domullo Hasan madrasah, Bozori alaf madrasah) is a two-storey madrasah building located in the historical center of the city of Bukhara, Bukhara Region, Republic of Uzbekistan. It is included in the national list of real estate objects of material and cultural heritage of Uzbekistan. Now it is put into modern use as a tourist service facility.

== History ==
The madrasah was built at the beginning of the 19th century in Kokilayi Hord Guzar of the capital of Bukhara Emirate, during the reign of the Uzbek ruler Haydar (1885–1910), with the funds of Hasan Akhund ibn Khal az-Zarir al-Bukhari (Domulla Hasan).

Domulla Hasan was born in 1779. During the eras of Amir Haydar and Amir Nasrullah Khan, he first worked as a mufti, taught at the Kokaldosh madrasa and rose to the rank of rector. He died on 21 June 1857, at the age of 78. After that, his son Abdulhaq was appointed as the headmaster of this madrasah.

After the establishment of the Soviet rule, the education of students in the madrasah was terminated.

According to the State program developed in 2010, the research of the madrasa in 2011, the emergency division of its parts into parts, structural strengthening, restoration and repair, and the beautification of its territory were planned, and 5 million soums were allocated for the purpose of these works.

The building of the madrasah, as an architectural monument of the city of Bukhara, was included in the national list of immovable property objects of the material and cultural heritage of Uzbekistan approved in 2019, and is now put into modern use as a tourist service facility. The lower rooms on the side of the main street have been converted into shops.

It is located on Mehtar Anbar Street, which belongs to Kokaldosh MFY in Bukhara.

== Architecture ==
The madrasah building is made of two-storey brick and consists of 23 rooms.
