= A'lam madrasah =

Madrasa in Bukhara, Uzbekistan

- A'lam madrasasi
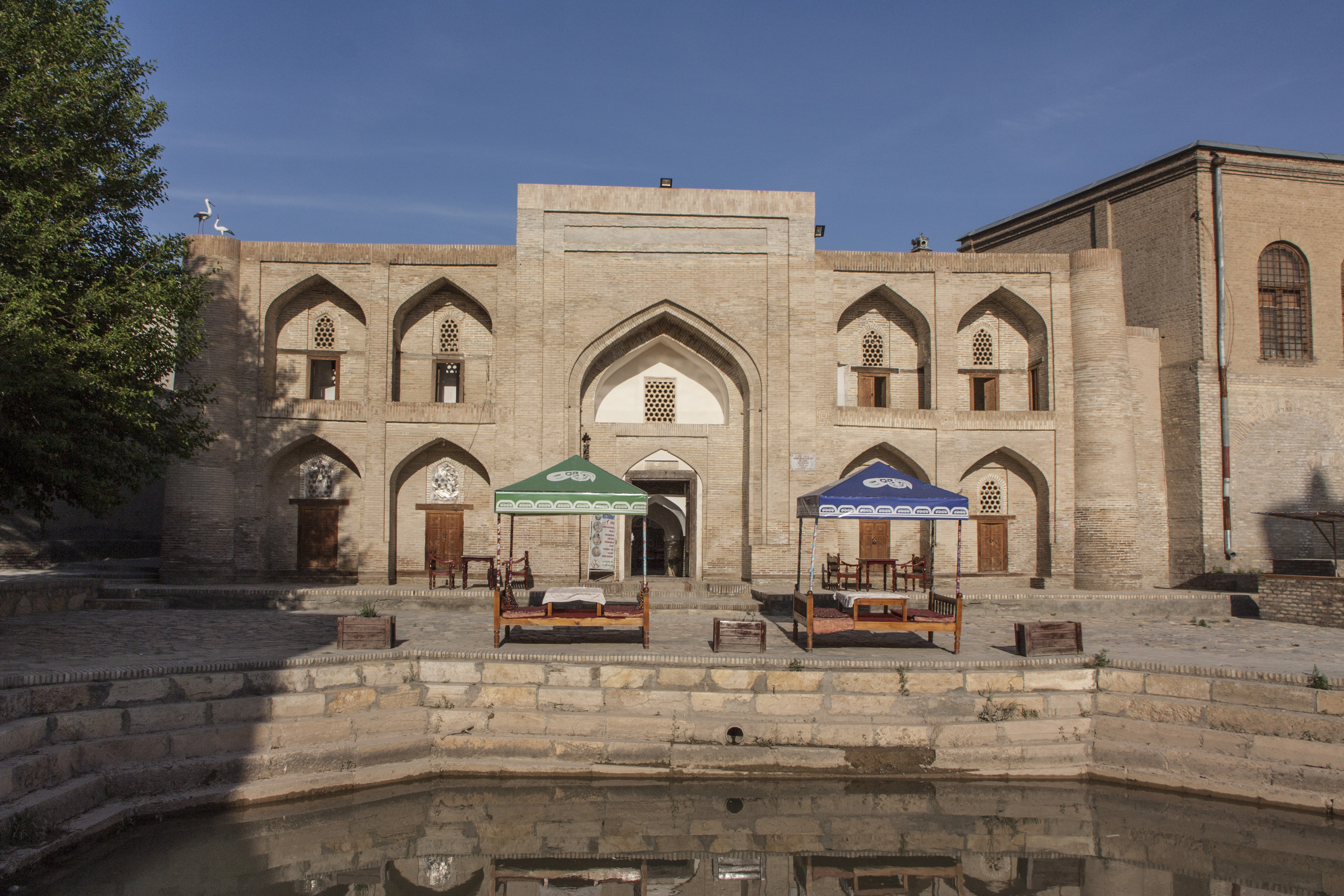
- Interactive map of the A'lam madrasah area

General information
- Status: State property.
- Type: Madrasah
- Architectural style: Central Asian architecture
- Location: Bukhara Region, Uzbekistan
- Coordinates: 39°46′21″N 64°25′01″E
- Owner: Mirzo Abdurahmon a'lam

Technical details
- Material: baked bricks

A'lam madrasah (Abdurahmani A'lam madrasah) is a two-story madrasah located in the historical center of the city of Bukhara, Bukhara Region, Republic of Uzbekistan. It is included in the national list of real estate objects of material and cultural heritage of Uzbekistan.

== History ==
A'lam madrasah was founded by Mirza Abdurahman a'lam in 1809 in Gavkushan guzar, during the reign of Amir Haydar, who ruled the Bukhara Emirate. Mirza Abdurahman served as alam in Bukhara Emirate. Mirza Abdurahman was one of the most famous people of his time. He was appointed to the post of alam during the reign of Amir Haydar, the emir of Bukhara. Abdurrahman Alam was sent as an ambassador to Muhammad Umar Khan because of his ability to find a way to solve the problem. He conducted this mission successfully. In 1809, Abdurahman A'lam died in Bukhara. This madrasah has two floors and was used for classes until the Shura Revolution. There was only one headmaster of this madrasah. A number of foundation documents related to Abdurahmani A'lam madrasa were found and studied. Researcher Abdusattor Jumanazarov studied a number of foundation documents related to this madrasah and found a foundation document dated 1888. It is written as follows: "Sayida Begum bint Mullah Mir Hanif, in the proud city of Bukhara, donates the land in Mirzo Haidar's house and the caravansary consisting of several rooms and shops in Mohi Toban's house for the late Mullah Mirza Abdurrahman Alam madrasah".

== Architecture ==
Abdurahmani Alam Madrasah has two floors and consists of 21 rooms. The madrasah is built of brick, wood, stone and ganch. The madrasah is now located on Bahovuddin Naqshband street and Gavkushan street.
