= Abdushukurboy Madrasa =

Madrasa in Bukhara, Uzbekistan

General information
- Architectural style: Central Asian
- Location: Azizon street, Bukhara Region
- Year built: 1892
- Opened: 1892
- Owner: Abdushukurboy

Technical details
- Material: Brick, wood, stone and plaster

The Abdushukurboy Madrasa was a madrasa (Islamic school) located in Bukhara Region. The madrasa no longer exists today.

== Background ==
The Abdushukurboy madrasa was built in 1892 on the Azizon street, during the reign of Amir 'Abd al-Ahad Khan of the Emirate of Bukhara, by Abdushukurboy. There are several sources that provide information about the madrasa.

According to Abdurauf Fitrat, the annual endowment of the madrasa was twenty-five thousand tenges. The researcher Abdusattor Jumanazarov studied several waqf documents related to the madrasa and gave some information about the madrasa. The waqf document states that the madrasa was built of brick and plaster on the Azizon alayhi rahma street, on the eastern side of the Zargaron madrasa of the Ashtarkhanid ruler Abdulaziz Khan. The madrasa consisted of rooms, a mosque and a lecture hall. The madrasa was bordered by the Zargaron madrasa on the west, a street on the east and north, and the houses of Abdushukurboy and Bohqa people on the south. The endower (waqif) endowed the madrasa with seven shops on the north side and 300 tanob (a unit of land) of pure land in the Tuzotli village of the Qorako'l district. The endower himself was the head (mutavvali) of the madrasa. After him, his descendants performed this duty.

The madrasa waqf document was written after the madrasa was built in the month of Jumada al-Awwal in the year 1310 AH (December 1892 CE), during the reign of Amir 'Abd al-Ahad Khan of Bukhara. Another copy of the madrasa waqf document has been preserved. In addition, there are four more documents related to the activities of the madrasa. The salaries of the teachers (mudarris) of the madrasa were 25 tenges. Sadri Ziyo wrote that the madrasa had 39 rooms. The Abdushukurboy madrasa consisted of 35 rooms. The madrasa was built in the Central Asian architectural style. The madrasa was made of brick, wood, stone and plaster.

== See also ==
- Avazboy Arab Madrasa
- Ismoilxoja Madrasa
- Shirgaron Madrasa
- Ikromkhoja Madrasa
- Abdulloh Kotib Madrasa
- Chuchuk Oyim Sangin Madrasa
