= Chuqur Madrasah =

Madrasa in Bukhara, Uzbekistan

Chuqur madrasah
- Chuqur madrasasi
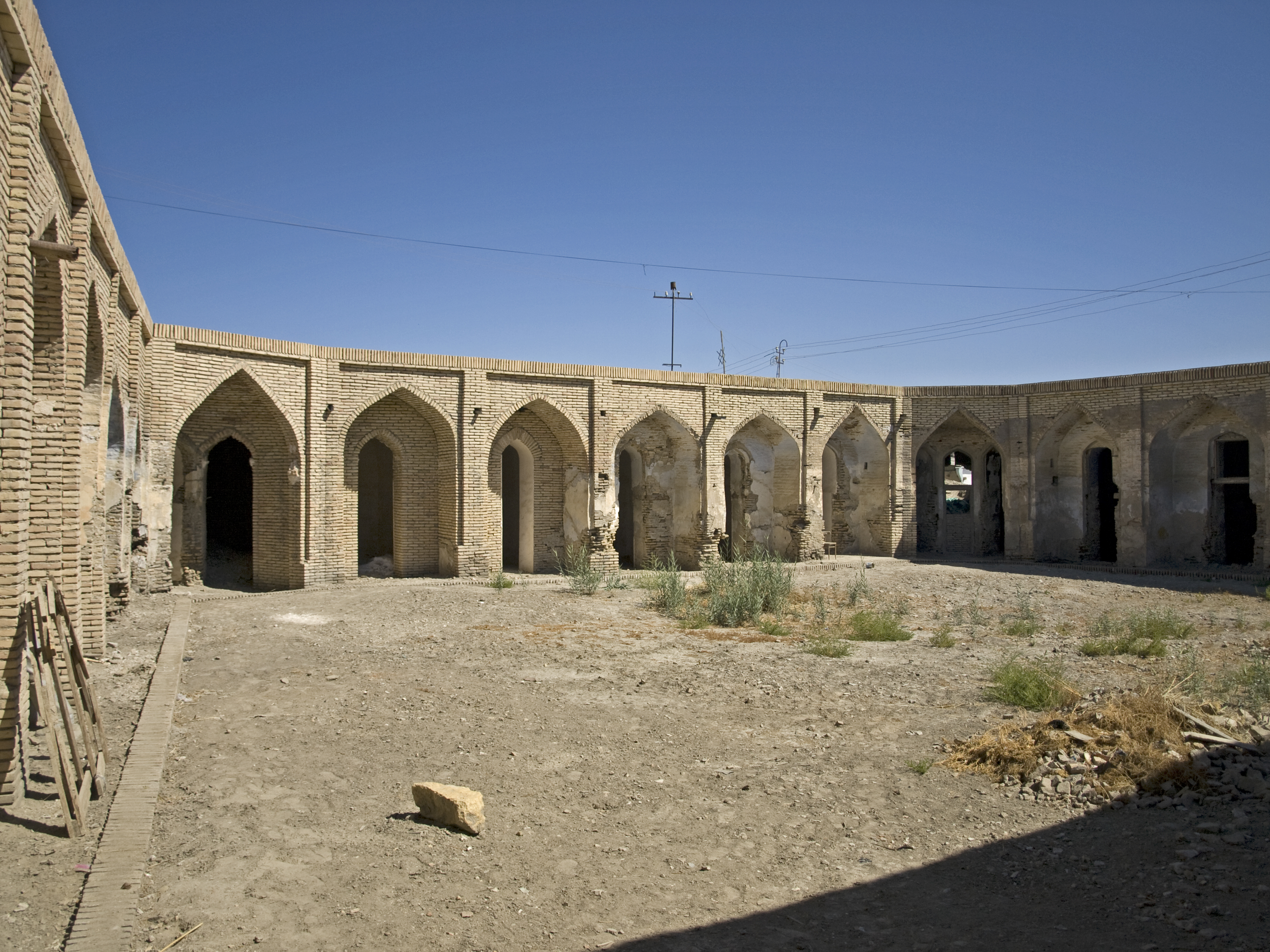
- Madrasah courtyard. 2015.
- Interactive map of the Chuqur madrasah area
- Alternative names: Kattahoja madrasah; Mavlavi Sharif madrasah

General information
- Status: under the protection of the state
- Type: Madrasah
- Architectural style: Central Asian architecture
- Location: Mirzo Ulugʻbek MFY, X.Ashurov Street, Bukhara Region, Uzbekistan
- Opened: XVIII
- Owner: State property. Bukhara Region Cultural Heritage Department on the basis of operational management rights

Technical details
- Material: baked bricks
- Size: 23 cells

Chuqur madrasah (Kattahoja madrasah; Mavlavi Sharif madrasah) is a one-story madrasa building located in the historical center of the city of Bukhara, Bukhara Region, Republic of Uzbekistan. It is included in the national list of real estate objects of material and cultural heritage of Uzbekistan.

Despite the allocation of funds under the 2010 state program for the restoration and repair of the madrasah, it remains neglected and in a deplorable state.

== History ==
The madrasah was built in the first half of the 18th century in the capital of the Bukhara Khanate under Maulana Sharif, during the rule of the Uzbek dynasty of Ashtarkhani (Joni), with the funds of a person named Asomiddinkhoja (Kattahoja).

Asomiddin Khoja (also called Kattakhoja by his contemporaries) was the grandson of Mawlavi Sharif. Kattakhoja worked as a qazikalon during the Ashtarkhanid period. During his time, he continues the path of his ancestors and participates in the activities of Mavlavi Sharif's household. He teaches in madrasahs. Meanwhile, he is building a new madrasah behind the house. Maulavi Sharif's family was considered one of the permanent branches of the people of the Tariqat even in later times. This situation continued until the revolution of the Soviets. Due to the fact that the madrasah is located deeper than the surrounding buildings, it later received the name Chuqur madrasah.

After the establishment of the Soviet rule, the education of students in the madrasah was terminated. According to the state program developed in 2010, the madrasah is planned to be researched in 2010.

The madrasah building, as an architectural monument of the city of Bukhara, was included in the national list of immovable property objects of the material and cultural heritage of Uzbekistan approved in 2019.

According to the data of 2020, a project was presented by the investor to preserve the integrity of the Chuqur madrasah, improve its condition, restore it and turn it into an attractive object for tourists. A preliminary project on the establishment of a tourist service facility on the basis of the madrasah was prepared and presented to the Scientific-Expert Council under the Department of Cultural Heritage of Uzbekistan.

It is located on the street named after Kh. Ashurov belonging to Mirzo Ulugbek MFY in Bukhara.

== Architecture ==
The building of the madrasah is made of baked brick and has 1 floor. It consists of 23 cells.

== Literatures ==
- Jumanazar A. (2017). Buxoro taʼlim tizimi tarixi. Toshkent: Akademnashr. p. 592. ISBN 978-9943-4728-2-2.
