= Khoja Kurban Madrasah =

Madrasa in Bukhara, Uzbekistan

General information
- Location: Abdulhaliq Gijduvani street, Abdulhaliq Gijduvani neighborhood, Bukhara city, Bukhara Region, Uzbekistan
- Year built: 1907–1908
- Owner: State Property

Technical details
- Material: baked brick
- Floor count: 2

Khoja Kurban Madrasah (Haji Kurban madrasah) is a two-story madrasa located on the Abdulhaliq Gijduvani street, Abdulhaliq Gijduvani neighborhood, Bukhara city, Bukhara Region, Republic of Uzbekistan. It is included in the national list of real estate objects of material and cultural heritage of Uzbekistan.

== History ==
Madrasah was built in 1907–1908 in Mir Tahur devan guzar of the capital of Bukhara Emirate, during the reign of Uzbek ruler Abdulahad Khan (1885–1910), with the funds of a person named Khoja (or Haji) Kurban ibn Rahmatullabai. It consisted of 27 rooms. A special shelter (pilgrimage) has been established under the madrasa for pilgrims and travelers arriving in Bukhara. 13 tanobs (unit of land measurement) of land in Kasri Ishrat area were endowed for the madrasa.

The endowment documents of the madrasa have reached us, and the document was confirmed with the seal of judge Mir Bakhriddin ibn Sadriddin. After the establishment of the Soviet rule, the education of students in the madrasa was terminated.

According to the State program developed in 2010, research, structural strengthening, restoration and repair of the madrasa, beautification of its territory were planned for 2011, and 50 million sums were allocated for the implementation of these works.

The building of the madrasah, as an architectural monument of the city of Bukhara, was included in the national list of real estate objects of the material and cultural heritage of Uzbekistan approved in 2019, and is now put into modern use as a tourist service facility.

According to the data of 2020, a project was presented by the investor to preserve the integrity of the Khoja Qurban madrasa, improve its condition, restore it and turn it into an attractive object for tourists. A preliminary project on the establishment of a tourist service facility on the basis of the madrasa was prepared and presented to the Scientific-Expert Council under the Department of Cultural Heritage of Uzbekistan .
