= Boloyi hovuz Madrasah =

Madrasa in Bukhara, Uzbekistan

- Boloyi hovuz madrasasi

General information
- Status: State property
- Type: Madrasah
- Architectural style: Central Asian architecture
- Location: Bukhara Region, Uzbekistan
- Opened: XVIII
- Owner: Sitorai Mohi Hossa

Technical details
- Material: baked bricks
- Size: 19 cells

Boloyi hovuz Madrasah is an educational institution located in Bukhara. Boloyi hovuz madrasah was built in the 18th century by Sitorai Mohi Hossa, the wife of Ashtarkhani ruler Subkhanqulikhan, who ruled the Bukhara Khanate, in the courtyard of the Shodimbi patriarchal mosque. Research scientist Abdusattor Jumanazarov studied a number of foundation documents related to this madrasah and provided information related to the madrasah. In the document, Madrasa Zaman Bilqisi (Podshah Bibi) will build a wooden and brick house, a jame mosque and nineteen rooms in the west of Registo in Bukhara, in the vicinity of the Shodimbi paternal mosque. To the west of the madrasah was the property of the foundation, to the north was a road, to the east was a pond, and to the south was the Shodimbi paternal madrasah. The princess built a madrasah here for the poor to get an education. To ensure the activities of the madrasah and the mosque, 1000 tanobs of Khoris land were endowed in Shorcha district of Khutfar district. Mutawwali was the foundation itself. The endowment funds were taken from tithes. A number of other foundation documents related to the Boloyi hovuz madrasah were found and studied. Madrasah is considered one of the higher educational institutions of the third level in the Bukhara educational system. In one of the historical documents, there is information that a mudarris named Mullah Ashur Muhammad, belonging to the Banorasp category, taught in the madrasah. Abdulkhoja Abdi wrote in his work that Mullah Dost, who created under the pseudonym "Nadir", taught students at Boloyi hovuz madrasah. Sadri Zia wrote that there were 22 cells in this madrasah. Boloyi pool madrasah consisted of 19 rooms. This madrasah was built in the style of Central Asian architecture. The madrasah is built of brick, wood, stone and ganch.
