= Bibi Khalifa Madrasah =

Madrasa in Bukhara, Uzbekistan

Bibi Khalifa madrasah
- Bibi Xalifa madrasasi

General information
- Status: State property.
- Type: Madrasah
- Architectural style: Central Asian architecture
- Location: Bukhara Region, Uzbekistan
- Owner: Bibi Khalifa

Technical details
- Material: brick, wood, stone and ganch
- Size: 30 cells

Bibi Khalifa madrasah is located in Bukhara. The madrasah has not been preserved today. Bibi Khalifa madrasah was built by Bibi Khalifa in the 17th century during the rule of Mir Tahur devan guzar, during the reign of Bukhara Khanate Subhonqulihan. Research scientist Abdusattor Jumanazarov studied a number of foundation documents related to this madrasah and provided information related to the madrasah. In the madrasah foundation document, the madrasah had 20 brick rooms, 4 domes, 10 wooden rooms, a classroom, and an inner and outer courtyard. There was a street to the west of Bibi Khalifa madrasah, Obi Rahmat pond to the north, a pond to the east, and courtyards to the south. For the madrasah, the foundation donated the cultivated land in Harkhanrud and Poyirud, and the orchard of fruit and non-fruit trees to the east of the madrasah. The madrasah was a foundation itself. According to some sources, only girls attended this madrasah. The original endowment document of the madrasa was formalized during the reign of Bukhara Khan Subkhanqulikhan and confirmed with the seal of 9 people. During the time of Bukhara emir Amir Shahmurad, the madrasah foundation document was copied. Five more documents related to the madrasah have been preserved. The document contains information about the mudarris who worked in the madrasah and their salaries. Among them, Khaji Abduvahid's salary was 24 gold, Mullah Bobojan's salary was 26 gold, and Mullah Najmiddin's salary was 25-30 gold. In addition, the documents contain the names of students who studied at the madrasah. Names of such students as Qori Hisamiddin, Atokhoja Bukhari are recorded. Madrasah of Bibi Khalifa consisted of 30 rooms. This madrasah was built in the style of Central Asian architecture. The madrasah is built of brick, wood, stone and ganch.
