= Bahoutdin Architectural Complex =

Memorial complex in Bukhara, Uzbekistan

Coordinates: 39.8013°N 64.5372°E

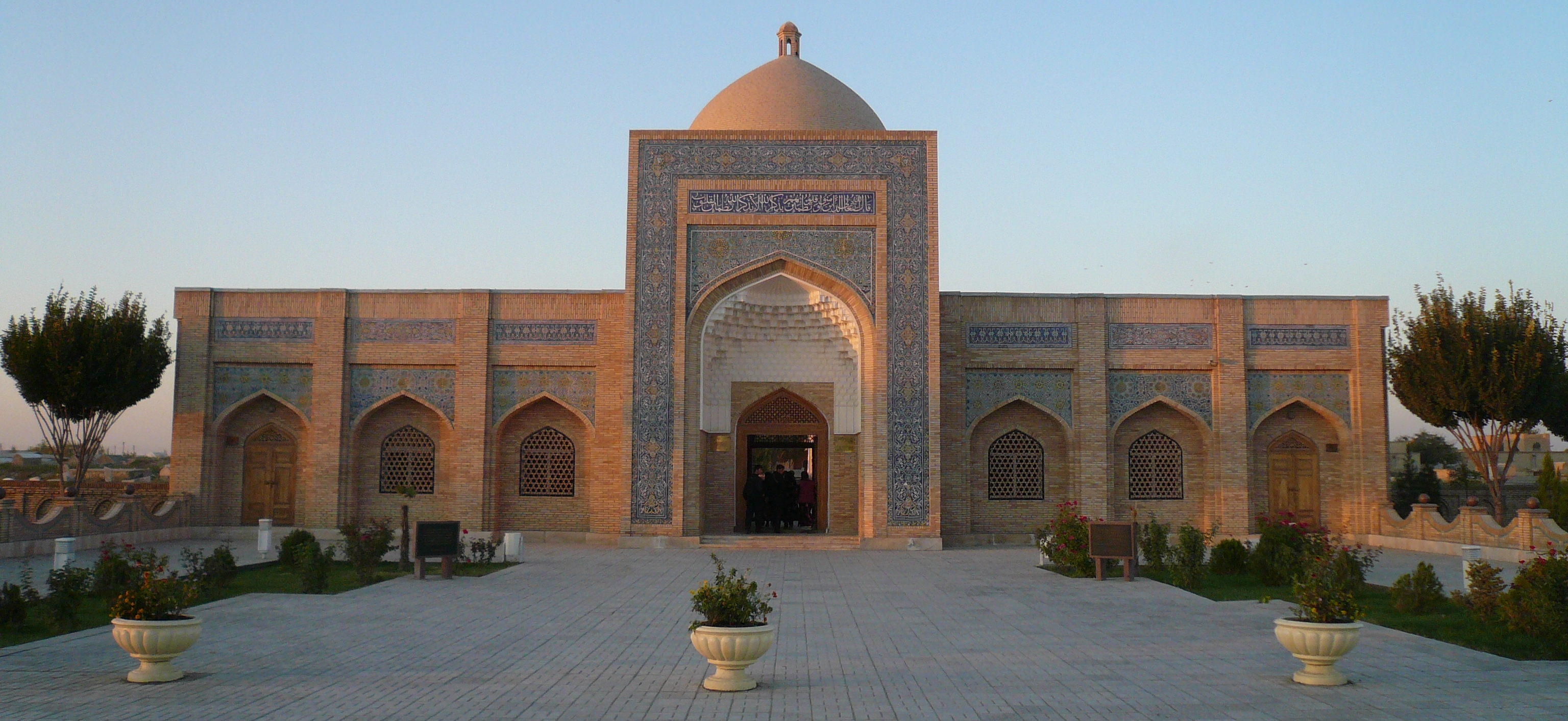
Bahaouddin Naqshbandi Mausoleum

Bahoutdin Architectural Complex (Uzbek: Bahouddin Naqshband yodgorlik majmuasi) is a complex in Bukhara, Uzbekistan, that includes the tomb of Baha-ud-Din Naqshband Bukhari, the founder of the Naqshbandi order, who died in 1389.

The ancient name of the location was Kasri Arifon.

== History ==
The Bahouddin Naqshband Memorial Complex is located approximately 10 kilometers northeast of Bukhara and has been developed over many centuries. During the time of the Soviets, it was forbidden to visit the grave here. The complex was initially established after the death of Bahouddin Naqshband and has been a place of pilgrimage for many generations. Bahouddin Naqshband's full name was Bahouddin Muhammad ibn Burhoniddin Muhammad al-Bukhori, and he lived from 1318 to 1389. He was also known by titles such as "Shohi Naqshband" and "Xojayi Buzruk." Bahouddin Naqshband is recognized as the seventh Sufi saint.

The Bahouddin Naqshband Memorial Complex begins with a small domed gatehouse. In 2003, the calligrapher Habibulloh Solih inscribed the 28th verse of the Surah Ar-Ra'd (The Thunder) on the wall near the "Bobi Islom" gate, using an Arabic script known as "Nasta'liq". In the muqarnas section of the gate, the names of the master builders and the year of construction are inscribed. A rubai (quatrain) is written in "Nasta'liq" script on the entrance door of the mausoleum. The tombs within the complex have been arranged according to the command of Abdulaziz Khan and are currently well-preserved. The largest building in the complex, the khanqah (Sufi lodge), was constructed between 1544 and 1545. Inside the cells of the khanqah, you can find poetry inscribed in "Nasta'liq" script. The memorial complex also includes a minaret featuring an inscription in "Nasta'liq" script, indicating that it was built in 1885.

== Site description ==
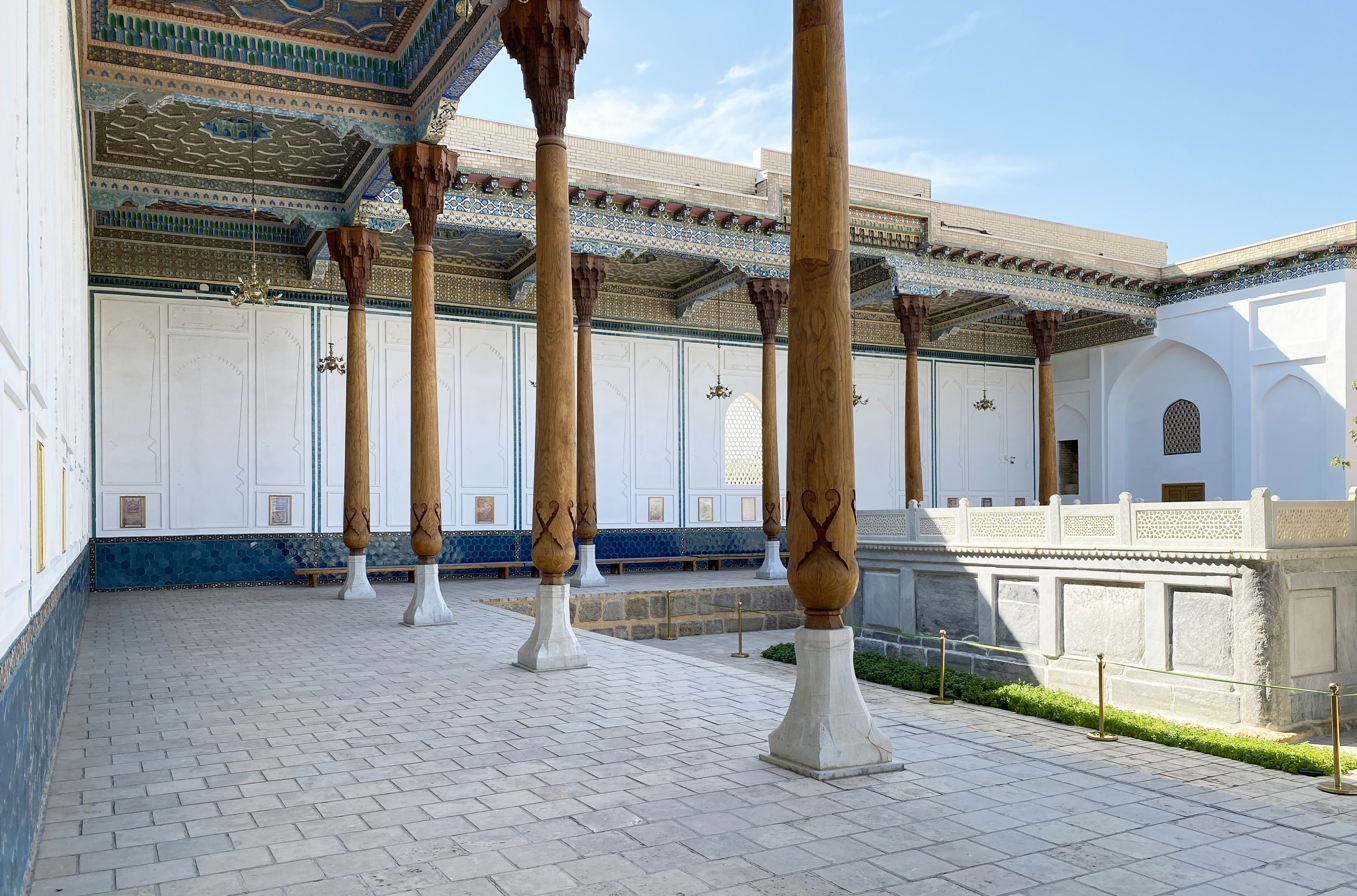
Main courtyard

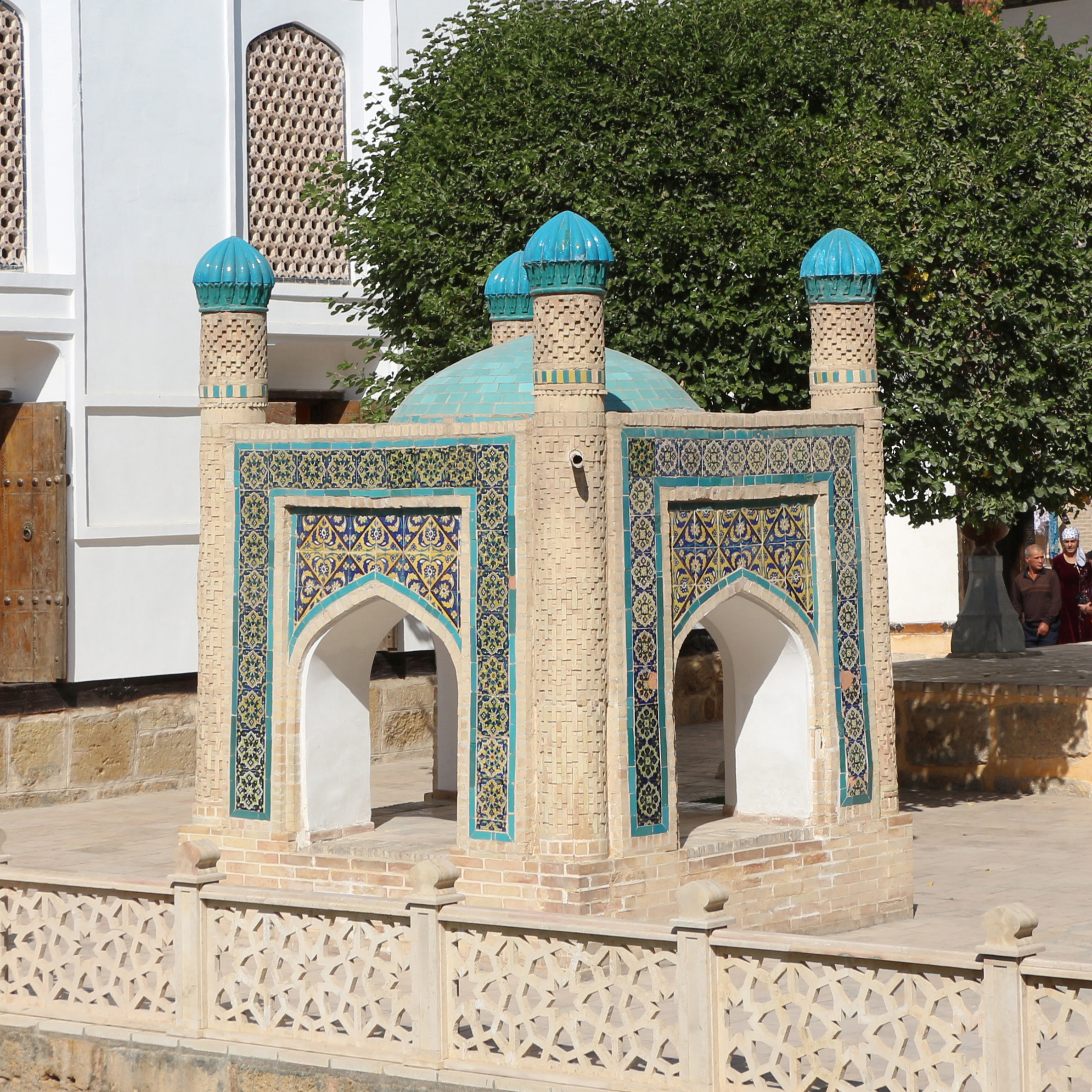
Well in the complex

== Restoration ==
The Bahouddin Naqshband Memorial Complex underwent restoration work in 1993, 2003, and 2010. In 2004, a Sufi museum and a scientific center were established within the complex. In 1993, on the occasion of the 675th anniversary of Bahouddin Naqshband's birth, the memorial complex was renovated. Additional buildings were added to the complex as well. In 2009, a plaque was placed in front of Bahouddin Naqshband's mausoleum.

== World Heritage Status ==
This site was added to the UNESCO World Heritage Tentative List on 18/01/08, in the Cultural category. It was finally listed as a World Heritage Site in 2023 as part of the Silk Roads: Zarafshan-Karakum Corridor listing.

== Bibliography ==
- Encyclopedia of Islam. - Tashkent: "National Encyclopedia of Uzbekistan" State Scientific Publishing House, 2017.
- Nasafi. Hazrat Bahauddin Naqshband. - Tashkent: "Fan", 1993.
- Stars of spirituality (Collector and responsible editor M. Khairullayev). - Tashkent: Publishing House of People's Heritage named after Abdulla Qadiri, 2001.

== See also ==
- Kasri Orifon Minaret
- Baha-ud-Din Naqshband Bukhari
