= Ismoilxoja Madrasa =

Madrasa in Bukhara, Uzbekistan

General information
- Architectural style: Central Asian
- Location: Muhammadyor Ttaliq alleyway, Bukhara Region
- Year built: 1822–1823
- Opened: 1823
- Owner: Muhammad Sobirxoja

Technical details
- Material: Baked brick, wood, stone and gypsum
- Floor count: 2

The Ismoilxoja Madrasa was a madrasa located in Bukhara Region. The madrasa no longer exists.

== Background ==
Ismoilxoja Madrasa was built in 1822–1823 by Muhammad Sobirxoja, son of Sayyid Muhammadxoja, in the Muhammadyor Ttaliq alleyway (Uzbek: guzar), during the reign of Amir Haydar in the Bukhara Emirate. The madrasa had two floors, a dome, an outer and inner courtyard, and a mosque. To the west of Ismoilxoja Madrasa, there was a caravanserai known as Urganjisaroy and the Muhammadyor Ttaliq khanqah, and to the south and east, there were properties belonging to the founder of the madrasa. The endower endowed 78.5 tanob of free land in the Anjurjoʻy Xoja Yakshanba cemetery, 100 tanob of land in the Kabutarxona cemetery in the Bukhara city area, three shops and two seed sellers in the mulla Shoh alleyway for the madrasa. The endower himself was the trustee of the madrasa. The father of the endower, Muhammad Sobirxoja, was appointed to the mosque in front of the madrasa. After him, his descendants were supposed to continue this work. Ten rooms on the east side of Ismoilxoja Madrasa were allocated to the endower's family. The madrasa had a mudarris with a white turban who taught the students. There are also documents related to the mudarris of the madrasa. Mulla Abdurauf was a mudarris at Ismoilxoja Madrasa, and his salary was 100 golden coins. In the early 20th century, mulla Abdukarimbek taught students at the madrasa. Sadri Ziyo wrote that there were 33 rooms in this madrasa. Ismoilxoja Madrasa consisted of 32 rooms. This madrasa was built in the style of Central Asian architecture. The madrasa was made of baked brick, wood, stone and gypsum.

== See also ==
- Avazboy Arab Madrasa
- Shirgaron Madrasa
- Abdushukurboy Madrasa
- Ikromkhoja Madrasa
- Abdulloh Kotib Madrasa
