= Shirgaron Madrasa =

Madrasa in Bukhara, Uzbekistan

General information
- Architectural style: Central Asian
- Location: Hoji Darugha street, Bukhara
- Year built: Second half of the 19th century

Technical details
- Material: Brick, wood, stone and plaster

Shirgaron Madrasa was an Islamic school (madrasa) located in Bukhara. The madrasa no longer exists today.

== Background ==
The Shirgaron madrasa was built in the 19th century on the Hoji Darugha street, during the reign of the Manghit dynasty in the Bukhara Emirate. There was also another madrasa on this street, called the Mulla Gafur madrasa. The researcher Abdusattor Jumanazarov suggested in his book that the Shirgaron madrasa might have been another name for the Mulla Gafur madrasa. According to a waqf document, the Mulla Gafur madrasa, which was located on the Hoji Darugha street, was endowed with a dyer's shop on the Hoja Halimiddin street in the month of Rabi al-Awwal in the year 1277 AH (September–October 1860 CE). The madrasa was partly built of brick and partly of wood and clay. The madrasa was surrounded by the house of Mulla Hakimboy, son of Mulla Nadr, on the west, other houses on the north, and the street mosque on the south. The head of the madrasa was a teacher (mudarris). Two students lived in each room of the madrasa. This waqf document was certified by the seal of the qadi al-qudat (chief judge) Mulla Sofikhoja, son of Mulla Omonullakhoja. Shirgaron (Shergiron) was one of the 11 gates of the city of Bukhara. The madrasa was located in front of this gate. There is another document that has reached us about this madrasa. Olga Sukhareva mentioned in her research that there was a wooden mosque-madrasa on this street. According to the author, the madrasa had 15 rooms and was built in the second half of the 19th century. Sadri Ziyo wrote that the madrasa had 9 rooms. The Shirgaron madrasa consisted of 9 rooms. The madrasa was built in the Central Asian architectural style. The madrasa was made of brick, wood, stone and plaster.

== See also ==
- Avazboy Arab Madrasa
- Ismoilxoja Madrasa
- Abdushukurboy Madrasa
- Ikromkhoja Madrasa
- Abdulloh Kotib Madrasa
