= Sadr-i Ziya =

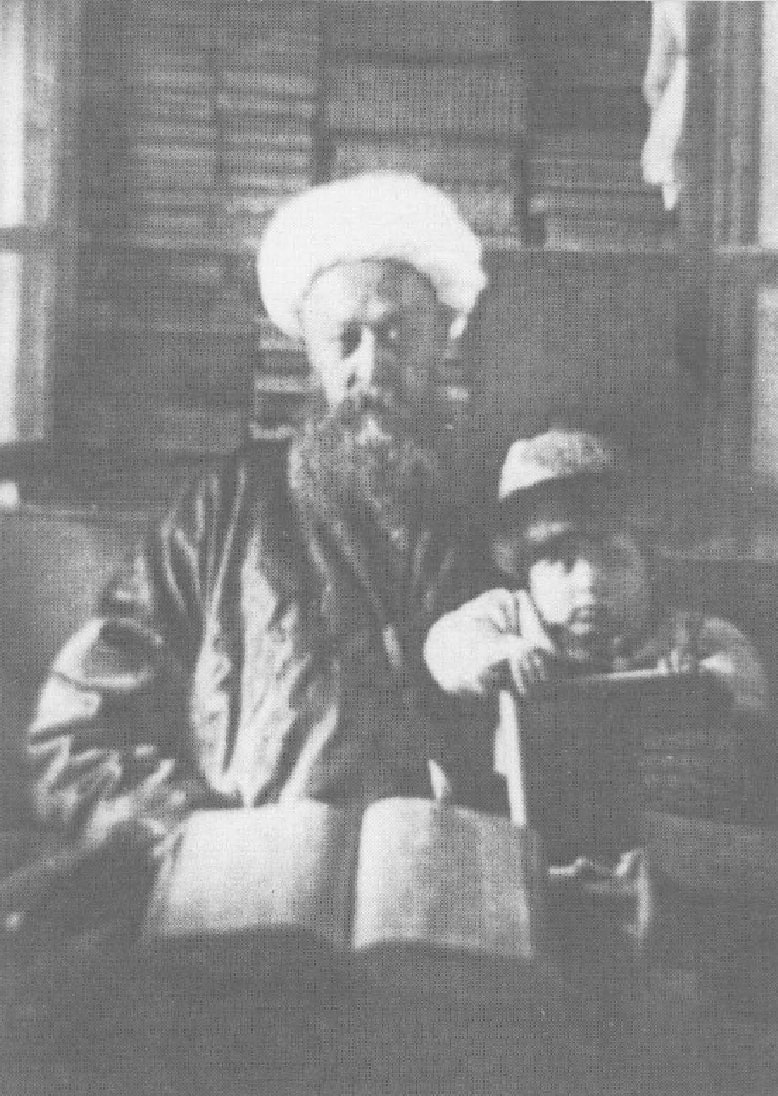
- Sadr-i Ziya and his son Muhammadjon Shakuri
- Born: February 2, 1867; Bukhara, Emirate of Bukhara
- Died: April 1932 (aged 65); Bukhara, Uzbek SSR, USSR
- Occupations: Administrator; Poet; Historian
- Relatives: Abd al-Shakur-i Ayat (father); Muhammadjon Shakuri (son)
- Writing career
- Language: Tajik Persian

Muhammad Sharif-i Sadr-i Ziya (Persian: محمد شریفِ صدرِ ضیا, Tajik: Муҳаммад Шарифи Садри Зиё) was a Tajik administrator, poet and historian in the Emirate of Bukhara.

He was the son of the qazi (judge) Abd al-Shakur-i Ayat, and father of the Tajik intellectual Muhammadjon Shakuri.

== Sources ==
- Allworth, Edward A. (2003). The Personal History of a Bukharan Intellectual: The Diary of Muḥammad Sharīf-i Ṣadr-i Ziyā. Brill Publishers. ISBN 978-9004131613.
