= Kogon District =

- District
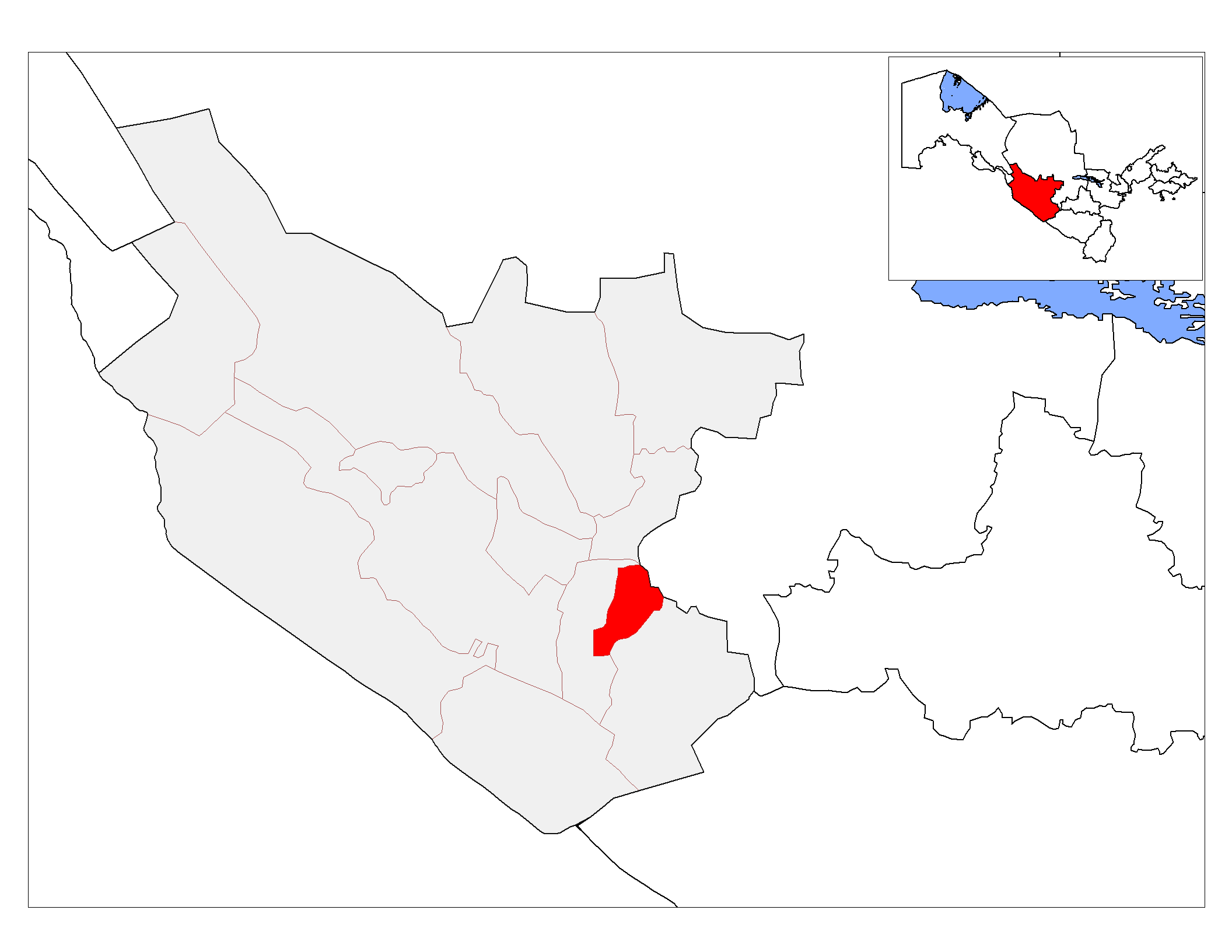
- Coordinates: 39°46′N 64°34′E
- Country: Uzbekistan
- Region: Bukhara Region
- Capital: Kogon

Area
  - Total: 500 km^{2} (190 sq mi)

Population (2021)
  - Total: 81,100
  - Density: 160/km^{2} (420/sq mi)
- Time zone: UTC+5 (UZT)

Kogon District (Uzbek: Kogon tumani) is a district of Bukhara Region in Uzbekistan. The capital lies at the city Kogon, itself not part of the district. It has an area of 500 km^{2} (190 sq mi) and its population is 81,100 (2021).

The district consists of two urban-type settlements (Sarayonobod, Tutikunda) and 9 rural communities.
