= Ikromkhoja Madrasa =

Madrasa in Bukhara, Uzbekistan

General information
- Architectural style: Central Asian
- Location: Ikromkhoja street, Bukhara Region
- Year built: 1898
- Opened: 1898
- Owner: Ikromkhoja

Technical details
- Material: Brick, wood, stone and plaster

The Ikromkhoja Madrasa (Uzbek: Ikromxoja madrasasi) was a madrasa (Islamic school) in Bukhara Region, Uzbekistan. The madrasa no longer exists today.

== Background ==
The Ikromkhoja madrasa was built in 1898 on the Ikromkhoja street, during the reign of Amir Abdulla Khan of the Bukhara Emirate, by Ikromkhoja. The researcher Abdusattor Jumanazarov studied several waqf documents related to the madrasa and gave some information about the madrasa. The madrasa was built of brick, wood and plaster, and had 4 rooms of brick and wood and 1 lecture hall. The madrasa was bordered by the house of Mirzakhoja on the west, a cemetery and the house of Sharofatoy, daughter of Qurbonoy, on the north, the house of Idriskhoja on the east, and the street mosque on the south. The endower (waqif) endowed the madrasa with two shops and a two-story building with 4 rooms on the Azizon street, and 14 tanob (a unit of land) of land near the Qasri ishrat pavilion on the north bank of the river in Bukhara.

The endower himself was the head (mutavvali) of the madrasa, and after his death, his descendants performed this duty. Nine students studied at this madrasa. The Ikromkhoja madrasa waqf document was 33.5 x 179 centimeters in size and written in Persian nastaliq script. This waqf document was certified by the seal of the qadi al-qudat (chief judge) Mir Badriddin and other officials during the reign of Amir Abdulla Khan of Bukhara. Sadri Ziyo wrote that the Ikromkhoja madrasa had 5 rooms. The Ikromkhoja madrasa consisted of 4 rooms. The madrasa was built in the Central Asian architectural style. The madrasa was made of brick, wood, stone and plaster.

== See also ==
- Avazboy Arab Madrasa
- Ismoilxoja Madrasa
- Shirgaron Madrasa
- Abdushukurboy Madrasa
