= Abdulloh Kotib Madrasa =

Madrasa in Bukhara, Uzbekistan

Abdullah Katib Madrasah
- Abdulloh kotib Madrasasi

General information
- Status: under the protection of the state
- Type: Madrasah
- Architectural style: Central Asian architecture
- Location: Bukhara Region, Uzbekistan
- Construction started: XIX century
- Owner: Abdullah Katib

Technical details
- Material: brick, wood, stone and ganch
- Size: 8 cells

The Abdulloh Kotib Madrasa was a madrasa located in Bukhara Region. It no longer exists today.

== Background ==
Abdulloh Kotib Madrasa was built in the 19th century by Abdulloh Kotib in the Mulla Payravi neighborhood, during the reign of Amir Abdulahad Khan of the Emirate of Bukhara. The Mulla Payravi neighborhood was mainly inhabited by teachers, imams and merchants. The scholar Abdusattor Jumanazarov studied a number of endowment documents related to this madrasa and provided information about it. The first endowment document states: "Mulla Abdulloh Moysafid A'mr, son of mulla Qurbon Maymanagi, a poor man from the noble Bukhara, endowed his house in the Mulla Payravi neighborhood in the month of Safar in the year 1307 AH (1889 CE)".

The madrasa was located west of Akrom Oqsoqol's house, east of Inoyatullaxoja's house, and had a street on the south and east sides. Abdulloh Kotib's house consisted of four lower and three upper rooms and a gate. The house was donated as a madrasa for students to study. The founder of the madrasa also endowed a grocery store and a butcher shop. Abdulloh Kotib himself was the trustee of the endowment property and after his death his duties were performed by the chief judge. The endowment document indicates that 12 students lived in six rooms of this madrasa. One room of the madrasa was allocated for the classroom. Another endowment document for the madrasa was formalized in 1891. Abdulloh Kotib endowed a paper shop for the madrasa. The document also provides information about the teachers who worked at the madrasa. It states that Mulla Qudratulloh's salary was 12 gold coins, and Mulla Abdukarim's salary was 4 tillas. The endowment documents also contain information that Mulla Idrisxoja taught at this madrasa in 1903–1904. Sadri Ziyo wrote that Abdulloh Kotib Madrasa had eight rooms. Abdulloh Kotib Madrasa consisted of eight rooms. The madrasa was built in the Central Asian architectural style. The madrasa was made of baked brick, wood, stone and plaster.
