= 'Abd al-Ahad Khan mausoleum =

ʽAbd al-Ahad Khan's mausouleum
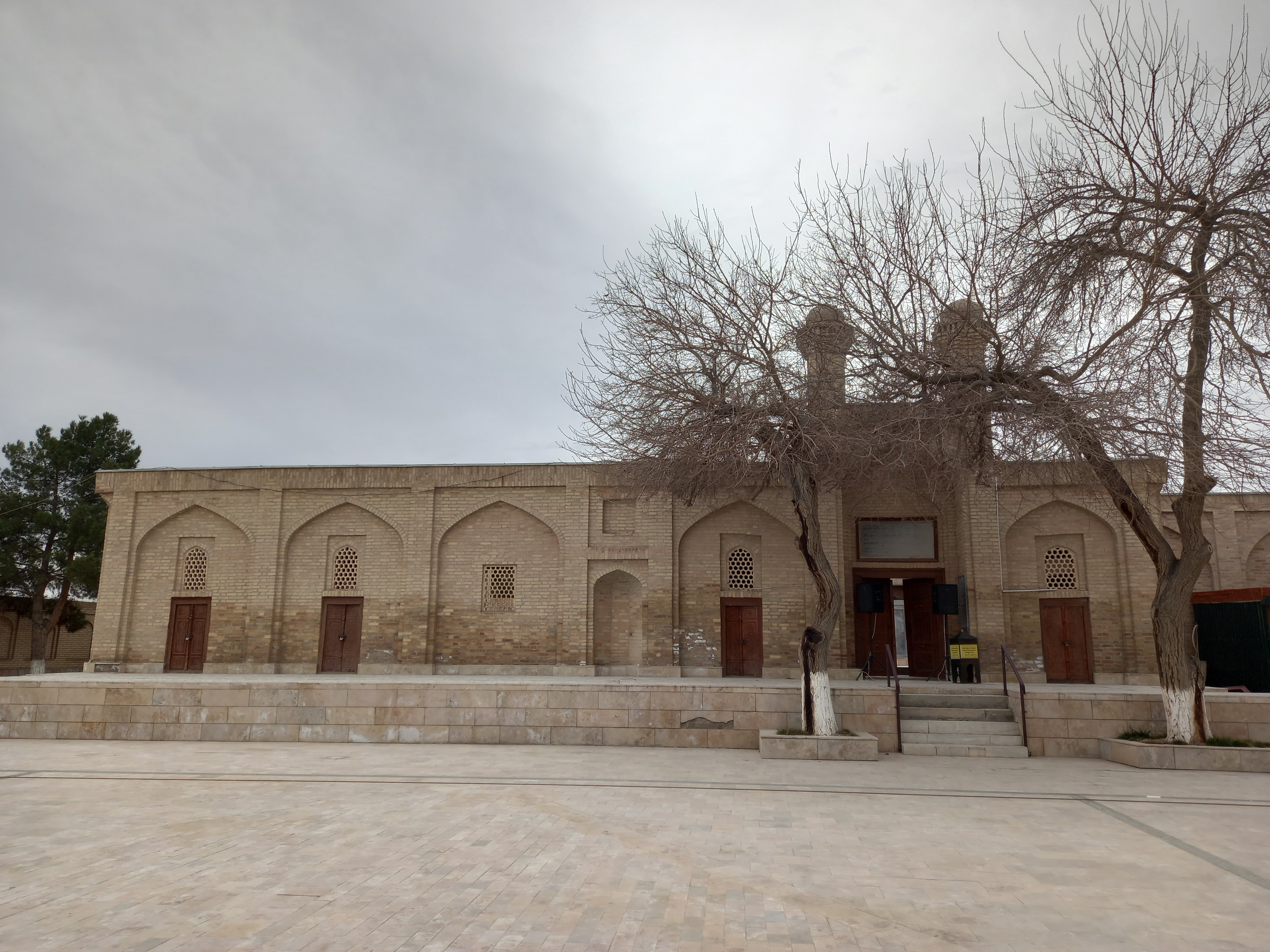
- Front view of ʽAbd al-Ahad Khan's mausouleum
- Interactive map of the ʽAbd al-Ahad Khan's mausouleum area

General information
- Status: Under the protection of the state
- Type: Mausoleum
- Location: Qasim Sheikh ensemble, Karmana street, Uzbekistan
- Coordinates: 40°7′59″N 65°22′2″E
- Grid position: geohack.php
- Construction started: In 1911
- Construction stopped: In 1911

Technical details
- Material: Baked brick
- Lifts/elevators: 1 floor

Design and construction
- Engineer: Abdurahim G'ozg'oniy

ʽAbd al-Ahad Khan's mausouleum is an architectural monument that is part of the Qasim Sheikh complex in Karmana. It was built in 1911 by the emir of Bukhara Sayyid Mir Muhammad Alim Khan around the grave of his father ʽAbd al-Ahad Khan. It is located in the southwestern part of Muhammad ibn al-Qasim Sheikh complex. Archaeologists have studied and said that there are no corpses (bones). It was restored in 2000-2001, and again restored in 2017, during the restoration in 2017, the rooms on the north side of the mausoleum were completely demolished and then again restored.

== History ==
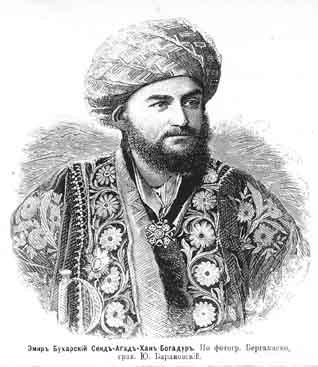
Emir ʽAbd al-Ahad Khan (1859-1911)

Emir ʽAbd al-Ahad Khan died in Khairabad Park close to Karmana on January 7, 1911, the sixth day of Muharram in 1329 AH. as a result of having kidney disease. His body was brought and buried next to Qasim Sheikh's house in Karmana, and a mausoleum was built around it by Amir Said Olim Khan.

== Architecture ==
ʽAbd al-Ahad Khan's mausouleum was built of baked bricks in a square shape. There are rooms in the northern and eastern parts, the entrance is on the eastern side. The door is gabled, the upper part of the door is covered with a marble inscription. There is a small corridor, the top of the corridor is made with a dome. The entrance to the yard of the hut is from the corridor. On one side of the corridor there is a door leading to the cell. The interior of the mausoleum has a wider courtyard on the south side, and a wooden porch on the northwest side. Opposite the porch is the tomb in the shape of square of ʽAbd al-Ahad Khan, covered with gray marble and granite. The height of the grave is 2 meters, the sides are 3 × 3 meters. There were inscriptions written in Arabic script on the wall on the northern side of the Saghana. As a result of the erosion of the stones and the coating of salt, it became impossible to read the inscriptions.

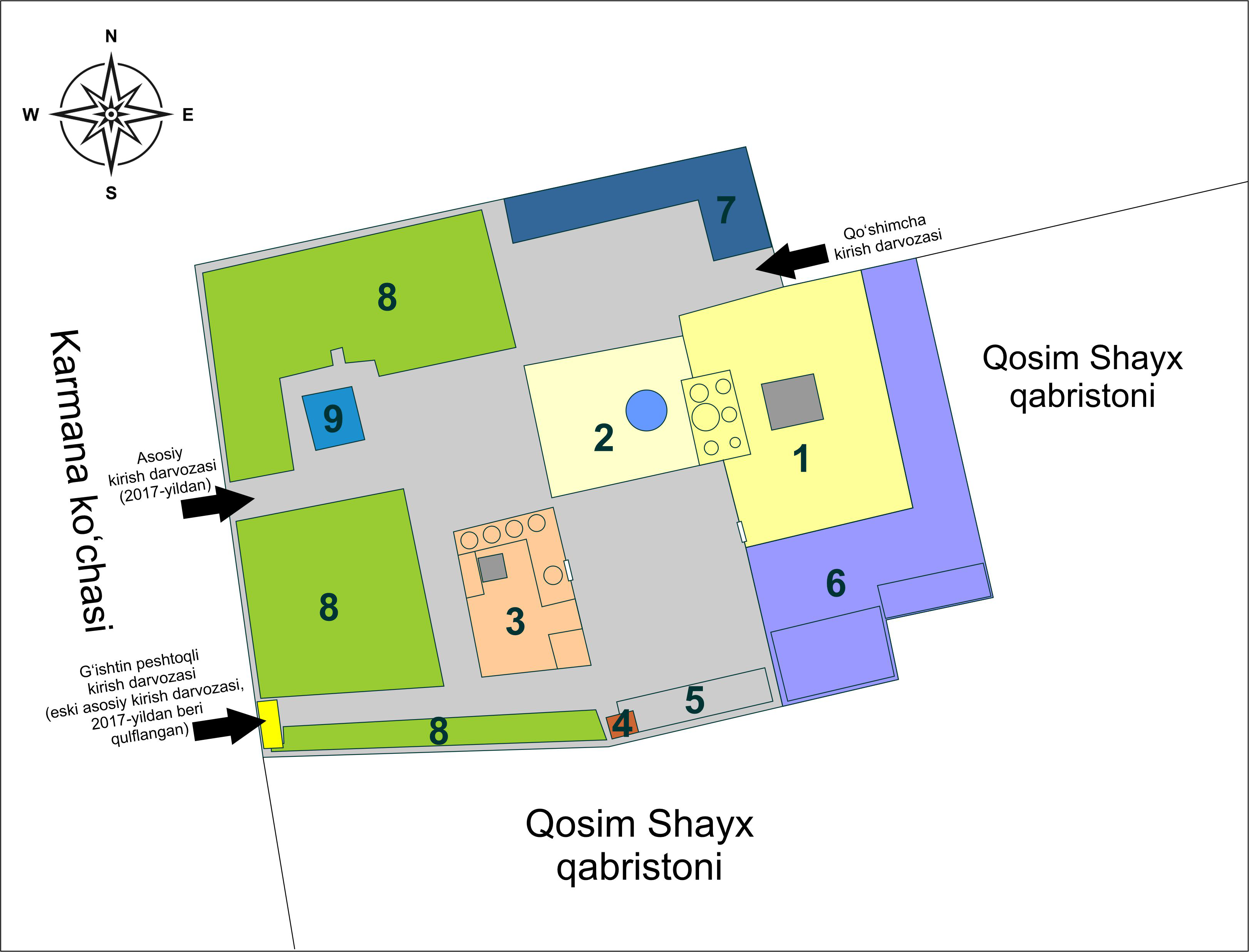
A map of Qasim Sheikh ensemble: 1. Qasim Sheikh's tomb; 2. Qasim Sheikh's house; 3. ʽAbd al-Ahad Khan's hut; 4. A preserved cell; 5. Foundations of unsaved cells; 6. Mosque toilet; 7. Private rooms of mosque mullahs; 8. Cultivated areas; 9. Pool

== Opening of the grave ==
Amir ʽAbd al-Ahad Khan's grave was opened twice during the Soviet Union.

In 1942–1943, the tomb was first uncovered (according to another source in 1943–1944). The opening of the grave was brought on by rumors that Amir Said Alimkhan might have fled with the gold from Bukhara while concealing it there.

In 1984, the grave was opened for the second time. Archaeologists who excavated the grave did not find anything except small finger bones. When the grave was first opened, it was concluded that the bones were collected and taken away.
