= Mirza Azim Sami =

Poet and historian from the Emirate of Bukhara

- Born: c. 1840 Bustan, Emirate of Bukhara
- Died: died after 1914
- Occupation: Historian, poet
- Language: Persian
- Notable works: Tuhfat-i shahi Tarikh-i Salatin-i Manghitiya; Dakhma-yi Shahan; Mir'at al-khayal Risala-yi insha

Mirza Azim Sami (Persian: میرزا عظیم سامی; c. 1840 – died after 1914) was a historian and poet in the Emirate of Bukhara. He is the author of several works in Persian, including the Tuhfat-i shahi (1899–1901) and Tarikh-i Salatin-i Manghitiya (1906/07), which are considered the "official" and "unofficial" versions of the history of Bukhara, respectively.

He was part of the first generation of Bukhara's literary enlightenment, known as Mo'arefparvari. He was a vocal critic of the Emirate of Bukhara, but unlike the reformist Jadid movement, was not an advocate of reform, but a return to what he considered the ideal of earlier times.

== Life ==
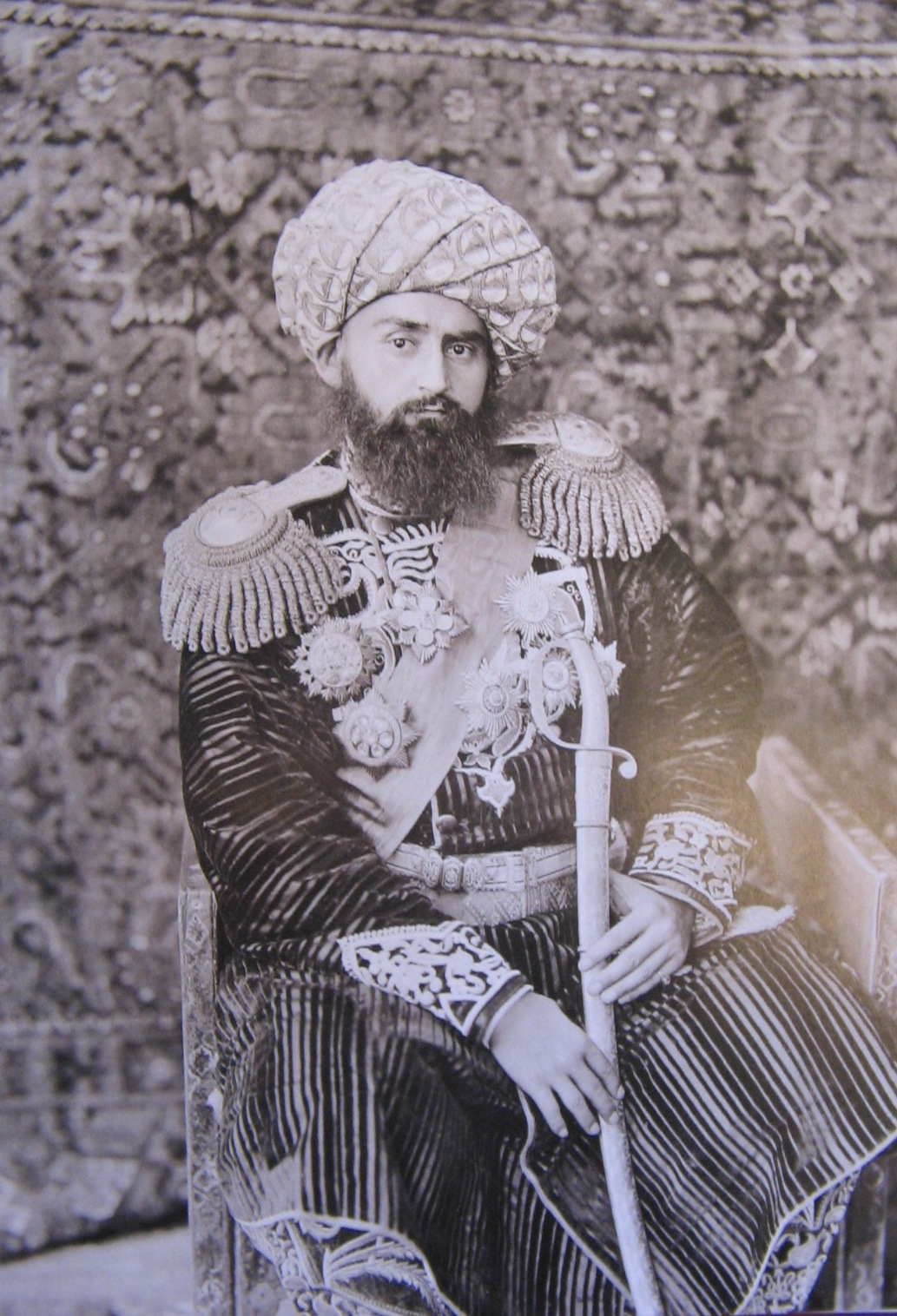
The Bukharan emir ʽAbd al-Ahad Khan, whom Sami initially served before being dismissed for his open criticism of the emir and his court

He was born in c. 1840 in the village of Bustan, near Bukhara, the capital of the Emirate of Bukhara. He was educated in a madrasa in Bukhara, and afterwards studied under Mulla Sa'd al-Din Maher, who gave him the pen name "Sami". From an early age, Sami had a passion for knowledge and a fascination with history.

After finishing his education, Sami worked under several Bukharan governors as a munshi (secretary). During the early reign of the Bukharan emir Muzaffar bin Nasrullah (r. 1860–1885), Sami was appointed as his secretary. During the Bukharan war with the Uzbek ruler of Shahrisabz in 1863–1864, Sami served in the Bukharan army as the nevisanda (official historian). During the war with Russia in 1866–1868, he was again in the Bukharan army, as the vaqayi nigar (chronicler). In 1868, the Bukharan Emirate became a protectorate of Russia.

When the crown prince ʽAbd al-Ahad Khan went to Moscow in 1883 to attend the coronation of Alexander III (r. 1881–1894), Sami was part of his retinue. He was reportedly also part of later diplomatic visits to Russia. Sami initially retained his position as secretary when Abd al-Ahad Khan became the new Bukharan emir in 1885. However, likely due to his open criticism of the emir and his court, Sami was dismissed in the mid-1890s.

Sami continued to live in poverty after that, duplicating manuscripts of the work of others and his own to support his family. By the end of his life, he had become blind, according to the contemporary writer Sadriddin Ayni. He is last mentioned in 1914, when he wrote a manuscript for his Risala-yi insha.

== Views ==
The last two decades of the 19th century saw the beginning of Bukhara's literary enlightenment, known as Mo'arefparvari. This movement had been caused by the Russian conquest of parts of Central Asia. The advancements in Russia and Europe became a focus of attention. The intellectuals considered the issues in the emirate to be caused by the emir and officials interpretation of Islam. Russia was seen as a liberator and an expression of advancement by the people.

The Iranian historian Azita Hamedani groups Sami as part of the first generation of the Mo'arefparvari, along with Ahmad Donish, Sadr-i Ziya, Makhdum Shahin, Abd al-Qadir Khajeh Soda, Qari Rahmatullah Vazeh and Muhammad-Siddiq Hayrat. Sami took part in gatherings of intellectuals devoted to exploring poetry and literature, continuing a tradition that had been established in the eastern Islamic world over many generations. In Bukhara, these gatherings were not limited to literature; conversations often extended to urgent social and political matters and included participants from both the reformist Jadid movement and the royal court. Some of these meetings took place in the home of Sadr-i Ziya, in which Sami was present.

Worries about the ethical decline and social disintegration of Bukharan society were both shared by Sami and the Jadids. However, Sami never described himself as a reformer in any of his publications, in contrast to the Jadids. Despite his resentment toward the Bukharan Emirate, he was more concerned with the current state of affairs and how far it had strayed from what he considered the ideal of earlier times. A more educated state that encompassed both Muslim and Western traditions was not his aim.

== Writings ==
Three historical chronicles were composed by Sami, written in Persian. Between 1899 and 1901, he first composed the Tuhfat-i shahi, a history of Bukhara from the rule of the Janid Muhammad Ubaidullah Khan (r. 1702–1711) up to the time of Sami. Although the text praises the rulers of the Bukharan Emirate in an effort to win back Abd al-Ahad Khan's support, it is considered to be abundant with important information, particularly about the Russian takeover of the Bukharan Emirate. The Tuhfat-i shahi was released for the public, in contrast to Sami's later historical work, the Tarikh-i Salatin-i Manghitiya, which was written in 1906/07.

This work was made for a small audience, as Sami openly disapproved the Bukharan Emirate and criticized events and individuals. Amongst the criticized figures were Nasrullah Khan (r. 1827–1860), Muzaffar bin Nasrullah and Abd al-Ahad Khan. The work also displays strong anti-Russian sentiment. Sami highlighted the role of the Ottoman ruler Abdul Hamid II (r. 1876–1909) in protecting Muslim territories against non-Muslims, presenting him as the ideal example of a modern Muslim ruler. The Tarikh-i Salatin-i Manghitiya follows the Perso-Islamic literary model, in which Sami's values are shaped by Islamic ideas of justice and proper behavior (adab), and his worldview is inspired by a prestigious past, in this instance the Timurid Empire. The work is commonly considered to be the "unofficial version" of the history of Bukhara, while the Tuhfat-i shahi is called the "official version".

Sami's third historical work was an extension of Muhammad-Sadiq Munshi Jandari's 1785 brief satirical history of the Janid dynasty, Dakhma-yi Shahan. There a segment about the Bukharan Emirate was added by Sami. When Sadriddin Ayni wrote his own historical chronicle of the Bukharan Emirate, he borrowed from Sami's historical chronicles.

Besides historical chronicles, Sami composed other works. His Mir'at al-khayal was a compilation of poetry primarily about people and events from his own time. His Risala-yi insha was a guide for secretaries, defining the ideal secretary as someone well-versed in literature, poetry, and grammar. He also composed an anthology of what he considered the ten greatest Bukharan poets of his time.

== Sources ==
- Becker, Seymour (2004). Russia's Protectorates in Central Asia: Bukhara and Khiva, 1865-1924. Routledge. ISBN 978-0415328036.
- Bregel, Yuri (1990). "Būstānī, Mīrzā Moḥammad". In Yarshater, Ehsan (ed.). Encyclopædia Iranica (Online ed.). Encyclopædia Iranica Foundation. ISBN 978-0710091321.
- Gross, Jo-Ann (1997). "Historical Memory, Cultural Identity, and Change: Mirza 'Abd al-'Aziz Sami's Representation of the Russian Conquest of Bukhara". In Brower, Daniel R.; Lazzerini, Edward J. (eds.). Russia's Orient: Imperial Borderlands and Peoples, 1700–1917. Indiana University Press. pp. 203–227. ISBN 978-0253211132.
- Hamedani, Azita (2023). "Enlightenment and Its Literary Heritage: Persian-Speaking Societies of Central Asia in the Late 19th and Early 20th Centuries". In Talattof, Kamran (ed.). Routledge Handbook of Post Classical and Contemporary Persian Literature. Taylor & Francis. pp. 68–95. ISBN 978-1032455266.
- von Kügelgen, Annie (2009). "Bukhara viii. Historiography of the Khanate, 1500-1920". In Yarshater, Ehsan (ed.). Encyclopædia Iranica (Online ed.). Encyclopædia Iranica Foundation. ISBN 978-0710091215.
- Morrison, Alexander (2021). The Russian Conquest of Central Asia: A Study in Imperial Expansion, 1814–1914. Cambridge University Press. ISBN 978-1107030305.
- Uyama, Tomohiko (2012). Asiatic Russia: Imperial Power in Regional and International Contexts. Routledge. ISBN 978-1136620102.
- Wilde, Andreas (2020). "Manghit dynasty". In Fleet, Kate; Krämer, Gudrun; Matringe, Denis; Nawas, John; Rowson, Everett (eds.). Encyclopaedia of Islam (3rd ed.). Brill Online. ISSN 1873-9830.
