= Karmana =

- Town
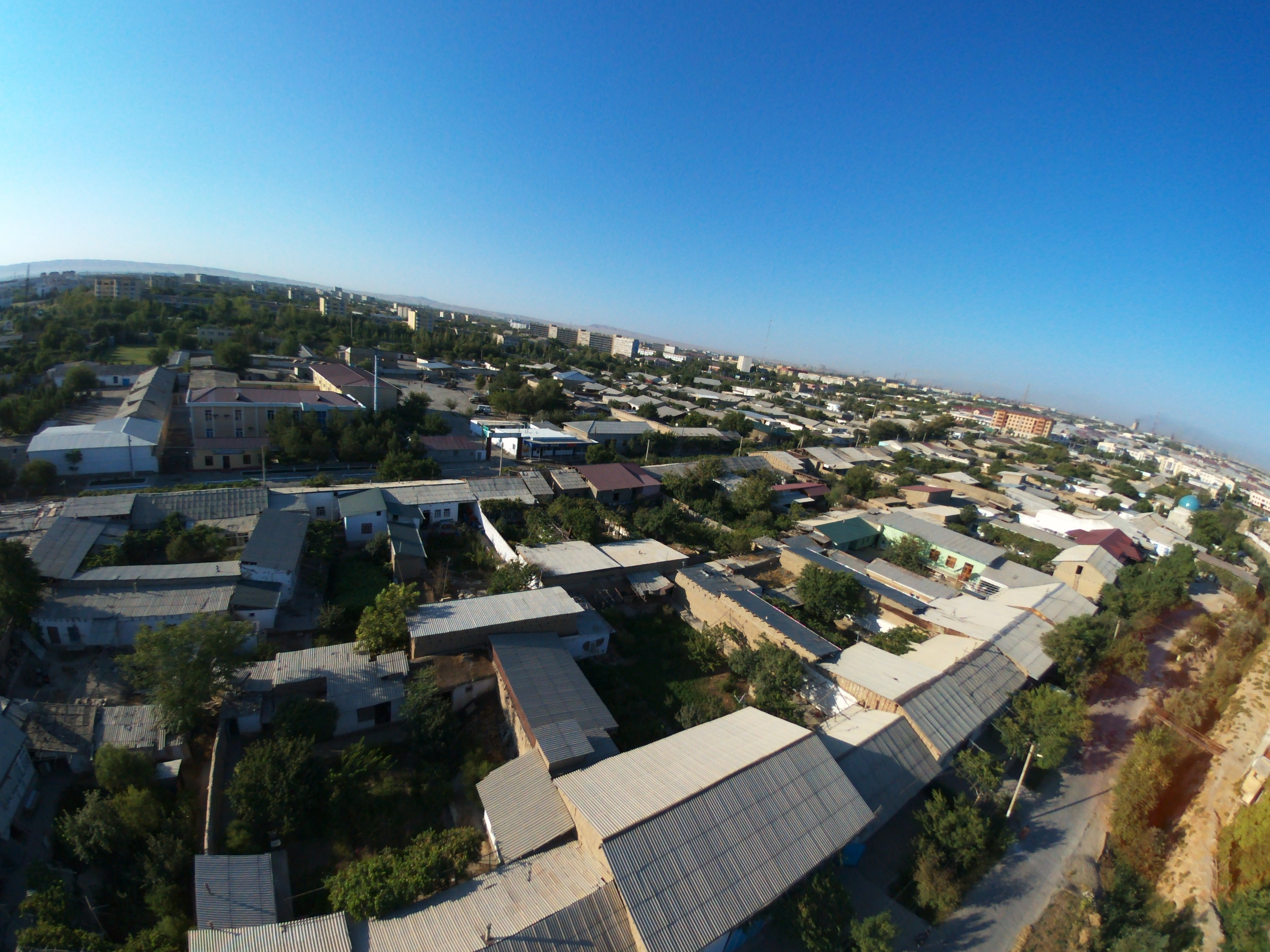

- Location in Uzbekistan
- Coordinates: 40°8′32″N 65°21′45″E
- Country: Uzbekistan
- Region: Navoiy Region
- District: Karmana District
- Rural-type settlement: 1968

Population (2004)
  - Total: 20,816
- Time zone: UTC+5 (UZT)

Karmana (Uzbek Cyrillic & Russian: Кармана) is a rural-type settlement and seat of Karmana District in Navoiy Region in central Uzbekistan. The town population in 1989 was 16,767 people.

== History ==
The original name of Karmanа city translated from Sogdian meant "big palace". The city of Kermine was one of the famous medieval cities of Central Asia. According to the 10th century author Narshakhi, Kermine was the birthplace of many literati and poets. There was a saying that the city of Kermine was called Badgia-i-hurdak ("pitcher") in ancient times.

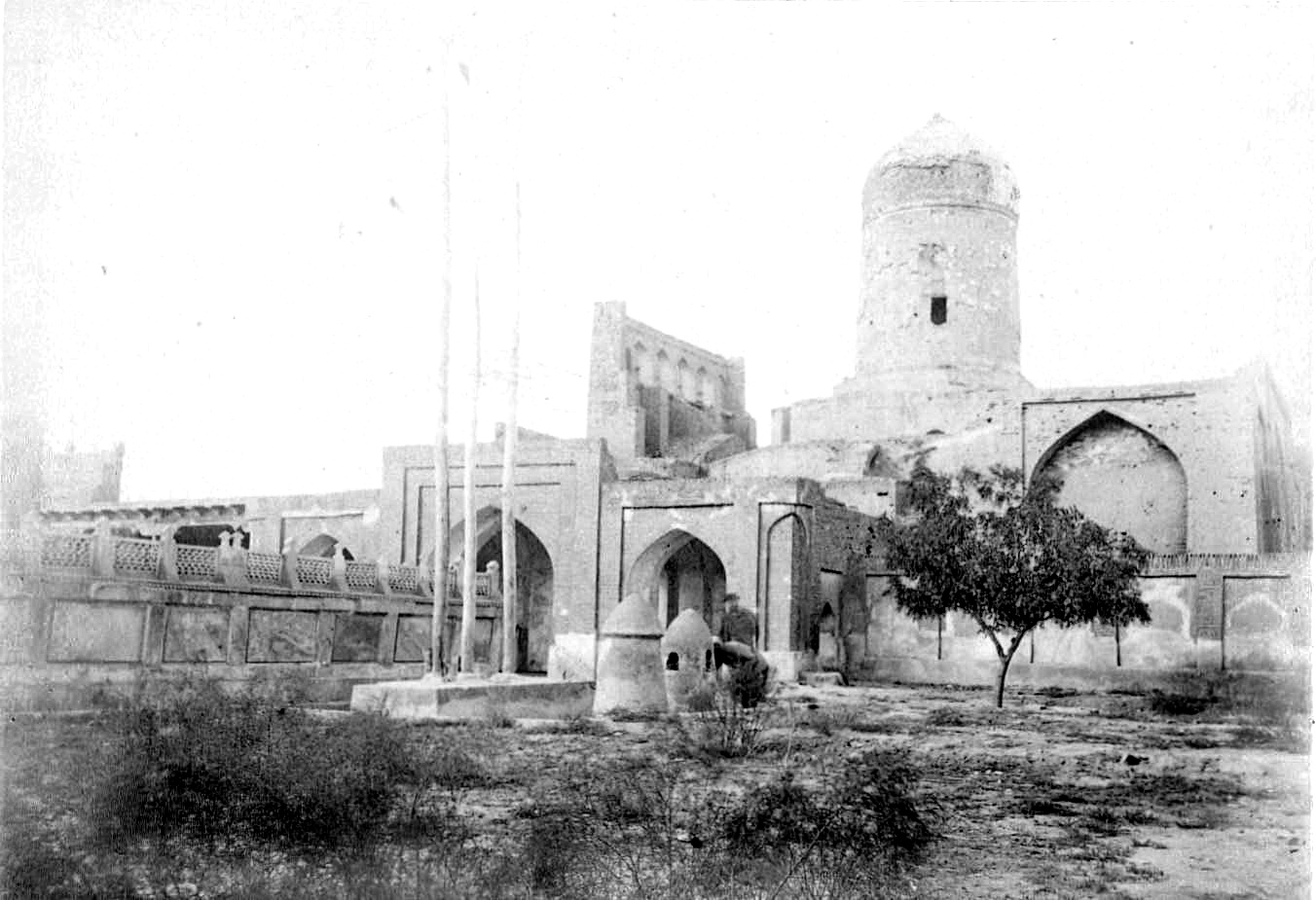
Karmana in 1887

In the 12th century, the city of Kermine was captured and destroyed by Khwarazmshah, Il-Arslan (1156-1172) in the course of military actions and resistance by the local inhabitants. Later, it was rebuilt and again became a major city in the 15th century.

Since the 16th century, the city of Kermine was part of the Bukhara Khanate and was the administrative center of the Kermine bekdom. In the last period of the Middle Ages, Kermine was turned into a bekdom with special advantage after a major clash between Said Abd al-Ahad Khan and influential members of the clergy and after his removal permanently from his capital to the city of Kermine. Said Abd al-Ahad Khan spent most of his time in Kermine and was buried there.

Kermine had a quadrangular citadel - urda with an area of 1.5 square versts (1.7 km^{2}). The last Bukhara emirs had two palaces in Kermine. One of them, the summer palace, was located outside the villages, and the second - inside the citadel, behind the fortress wall. Neither the citadel nor the palace in the emir's citadel have survived to our days.

During World War II, in 1942, the 7th Infantry Division of the Polish Anders' Army was stationed and organized in Karmana, before it was evacuated from Uzbekistan to fight against Nazi Germany. There is a Polish military cemetery in Karmana.

== Population ==
Historical population
Year	Pop.	±%
1970	12,970	—
1979	13,879	+7.0%
1989	16,767	+20.8%

== Status ==
Karmana was separated from the Navoiy city on December 12, 2003, and granted its own administrative status. While administratively under the jurisdiction of the Karmana district, certain locations within the town of Karmana are considered de jure as part of Navoiy City. These locations include:

The former Navoiy Pedagogical and Service College (formerly known as Navoiy Pedagogical College), is situated within Karmana town. The "Navoiy Avtoshohbekat" (Navoiy Car Market), is located at the center of Karmana town on Toshkent Street. Furthermore, the Navoiy Regional Road Safety Department, responsible for regional-level operations, is also situated within the boundaries of Karmana town .

== Sights ==
Sights and points of interest in Karmana include:

- Qosim Sheikh complex
- 'Abd al-Ahad Khan mausoleum
- Mir-Sayid Bakhrom Mausoleum
- Mirza-Charbagh Residence
- Two Polish military cemeteries

== Culture ==
=== Museum ===
In the southern part of Karmana town, there is a historical and ethnographic museum of the Navoiy region, established in 1992. Its exhibition includes artifacts collected from Karmana town and surrounding areas, such as ancient pottery, jewelry, clothing, textiles, household items, and more. The museum also houses replicas of local wildlife and the works of local artists.

=== Theatre ===
During the Soviet era, there was a cinema in Karmana named "Zarafshon." It operated during the early years of Uzbekistan's independence but was later repurposed for special events and no longer functioned as a regular cinema.

=== Monuments of cultural heritage ===
Although Karmana town is famous for its historical significance, there are very few well-preserved historical sites in the town itself. Out of the 44 material and cultural heritage objects that remain in the Karmana district, there are 5 architectural monuments, 1 monumental art monument, and 1 historically significant site located within the town of Karmana.
