= Mirza-Charbagh Residence =

Mirzachorbogh residence
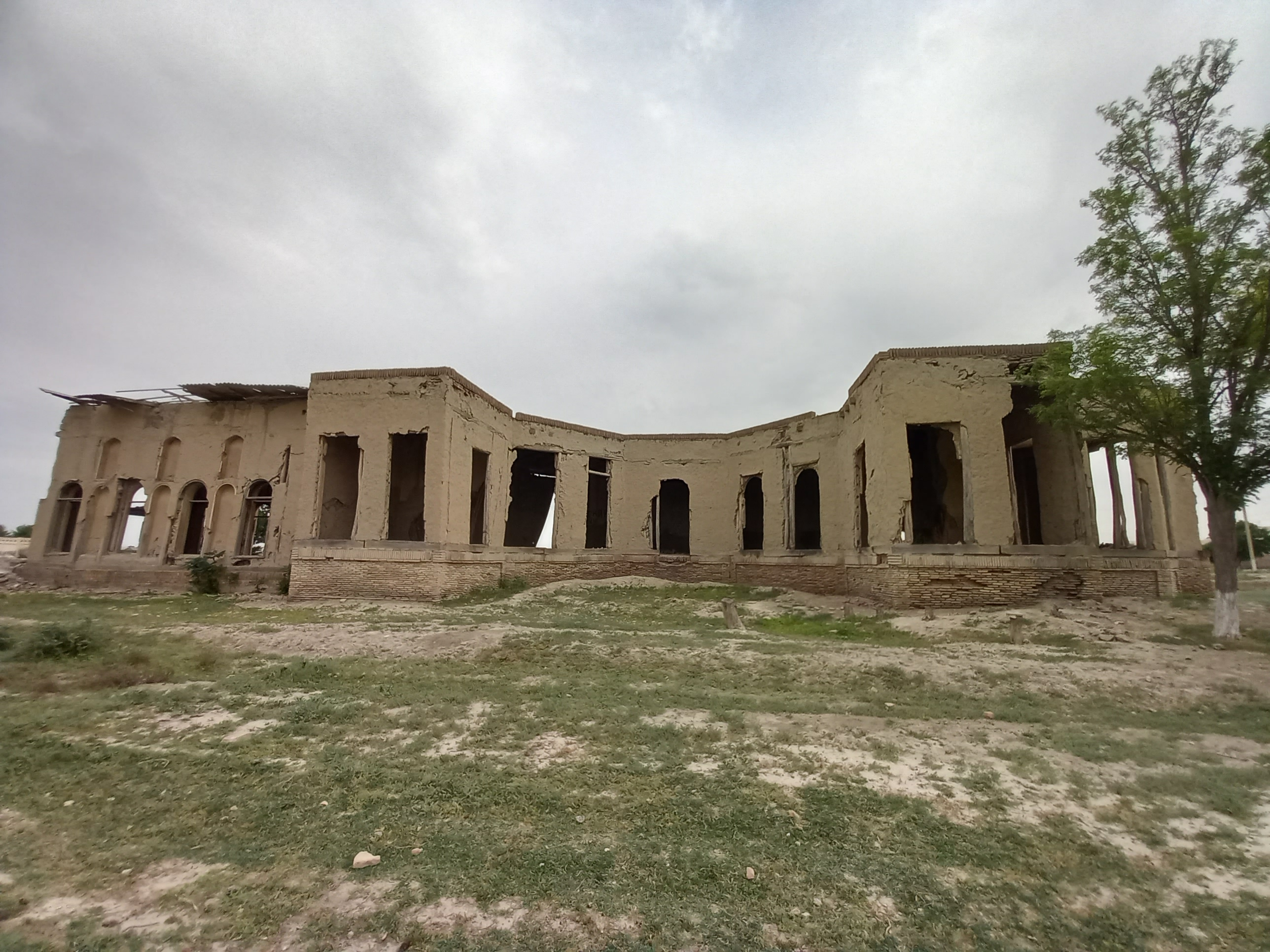
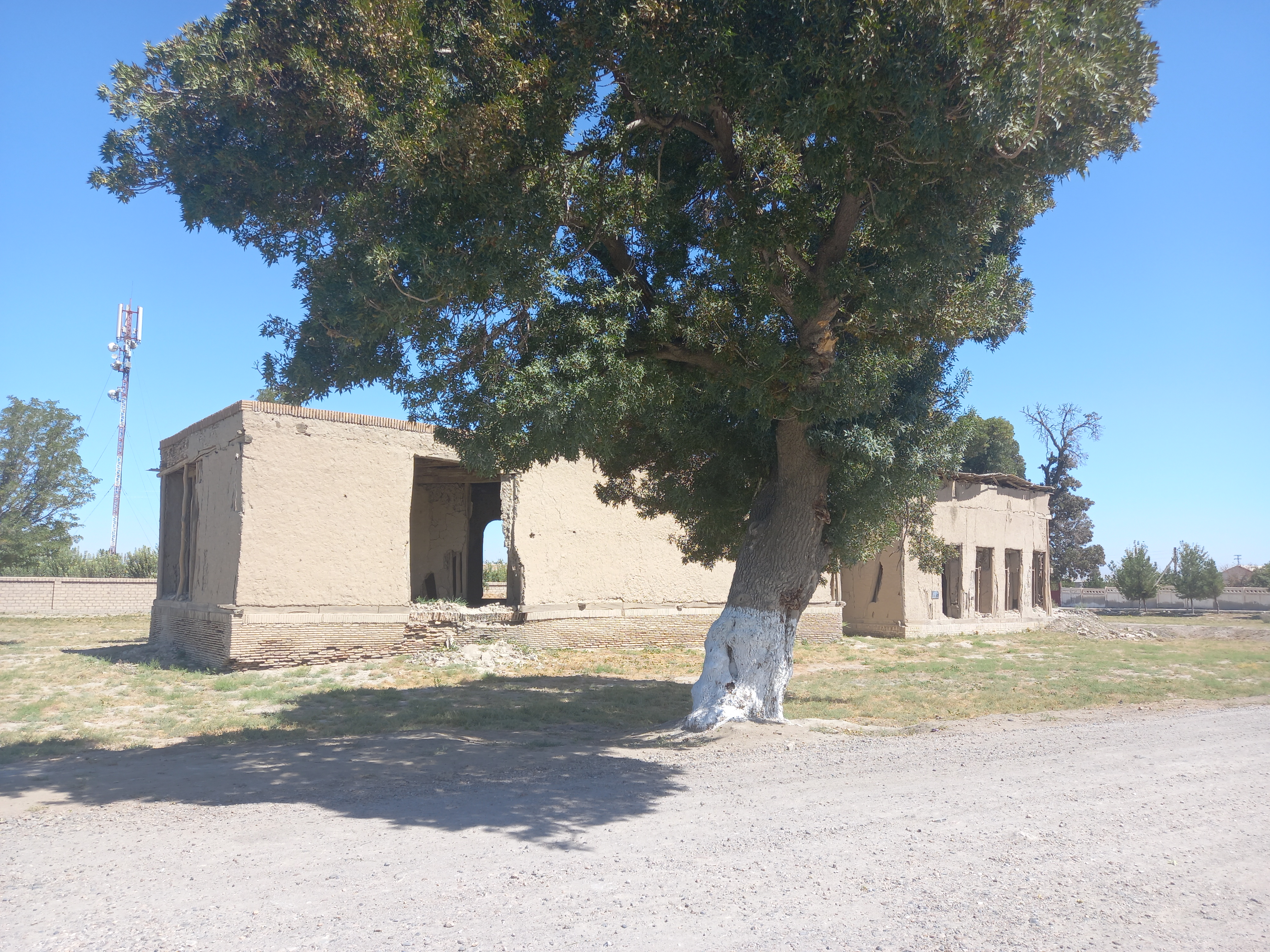
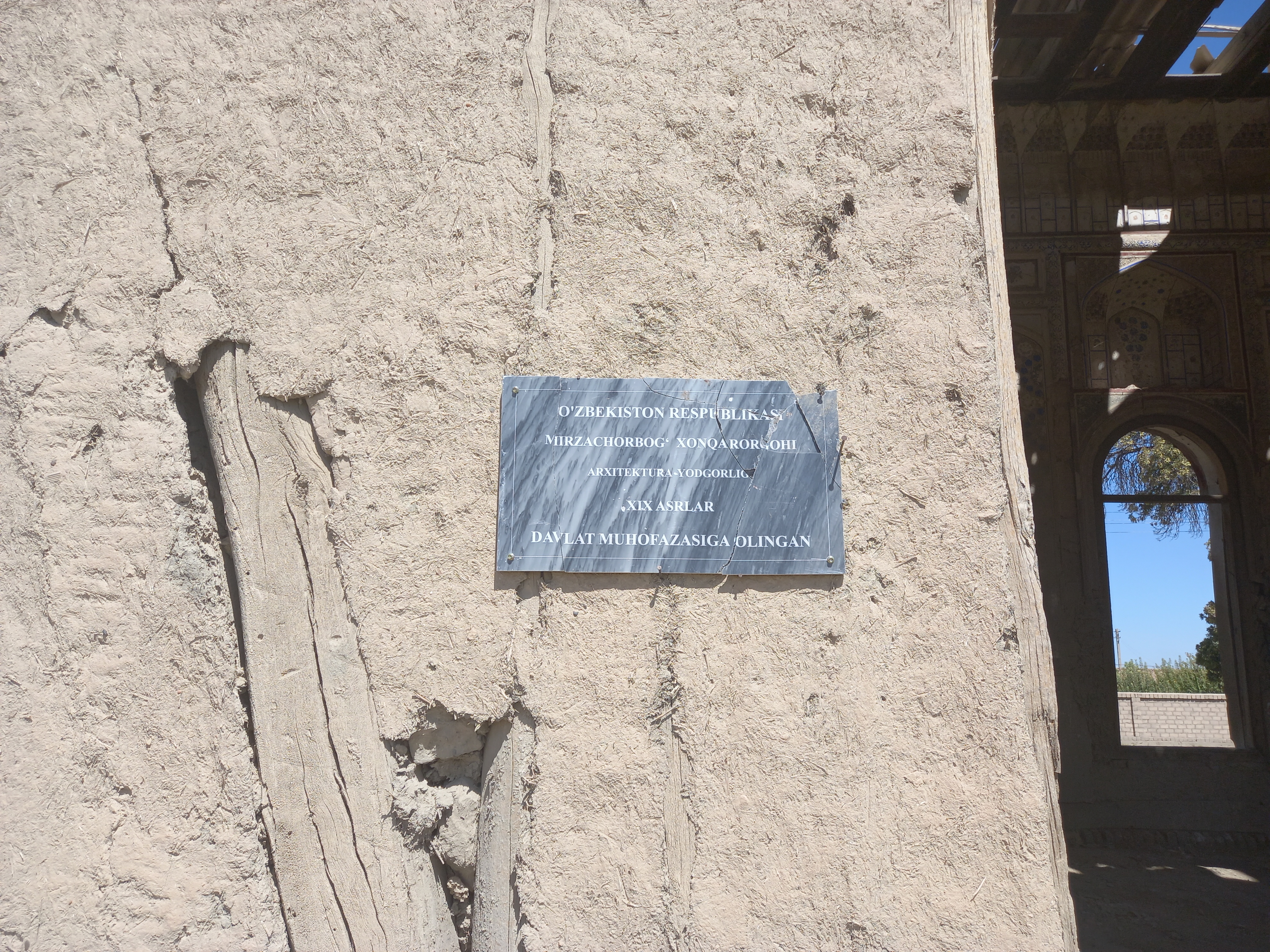
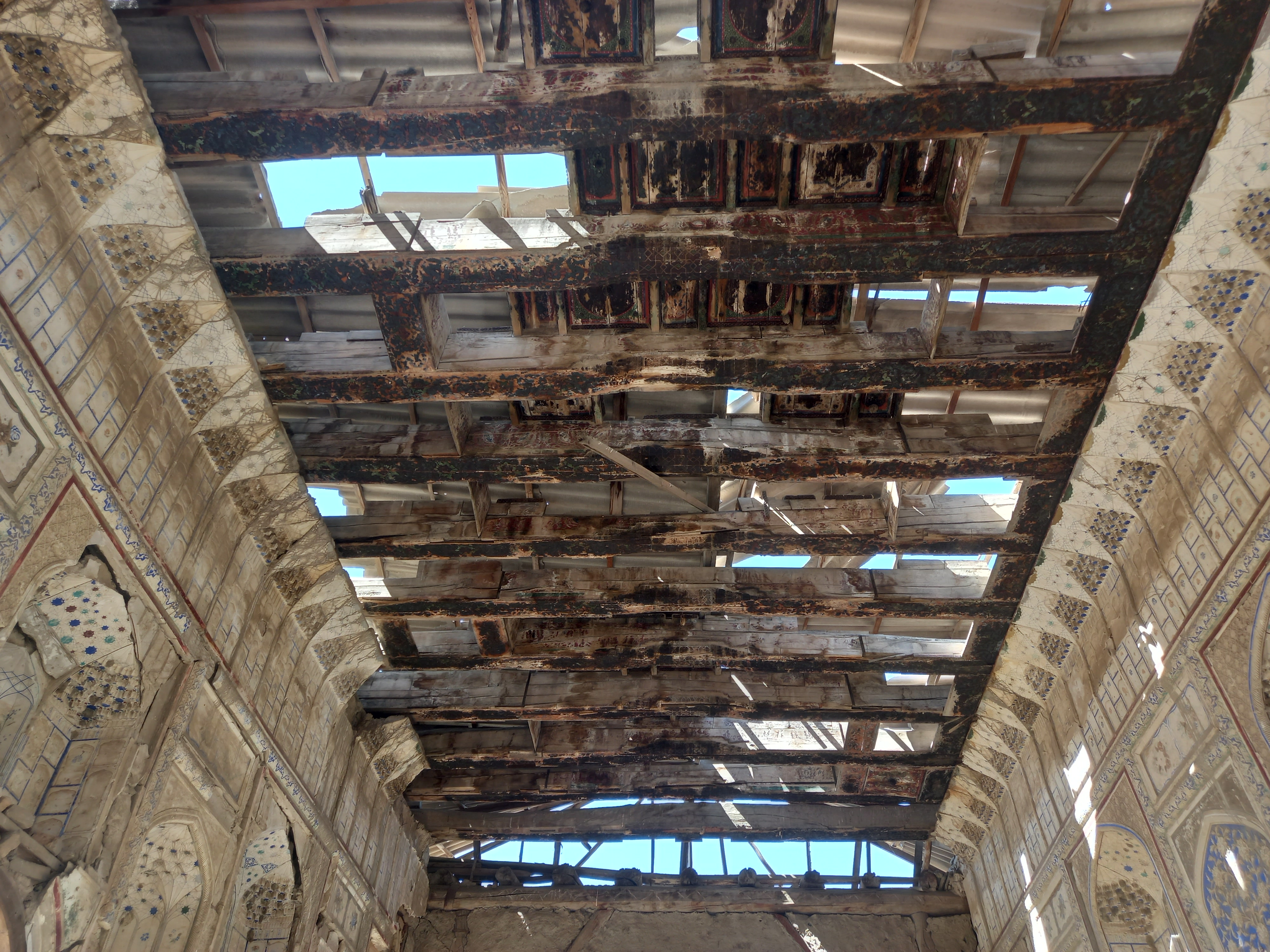
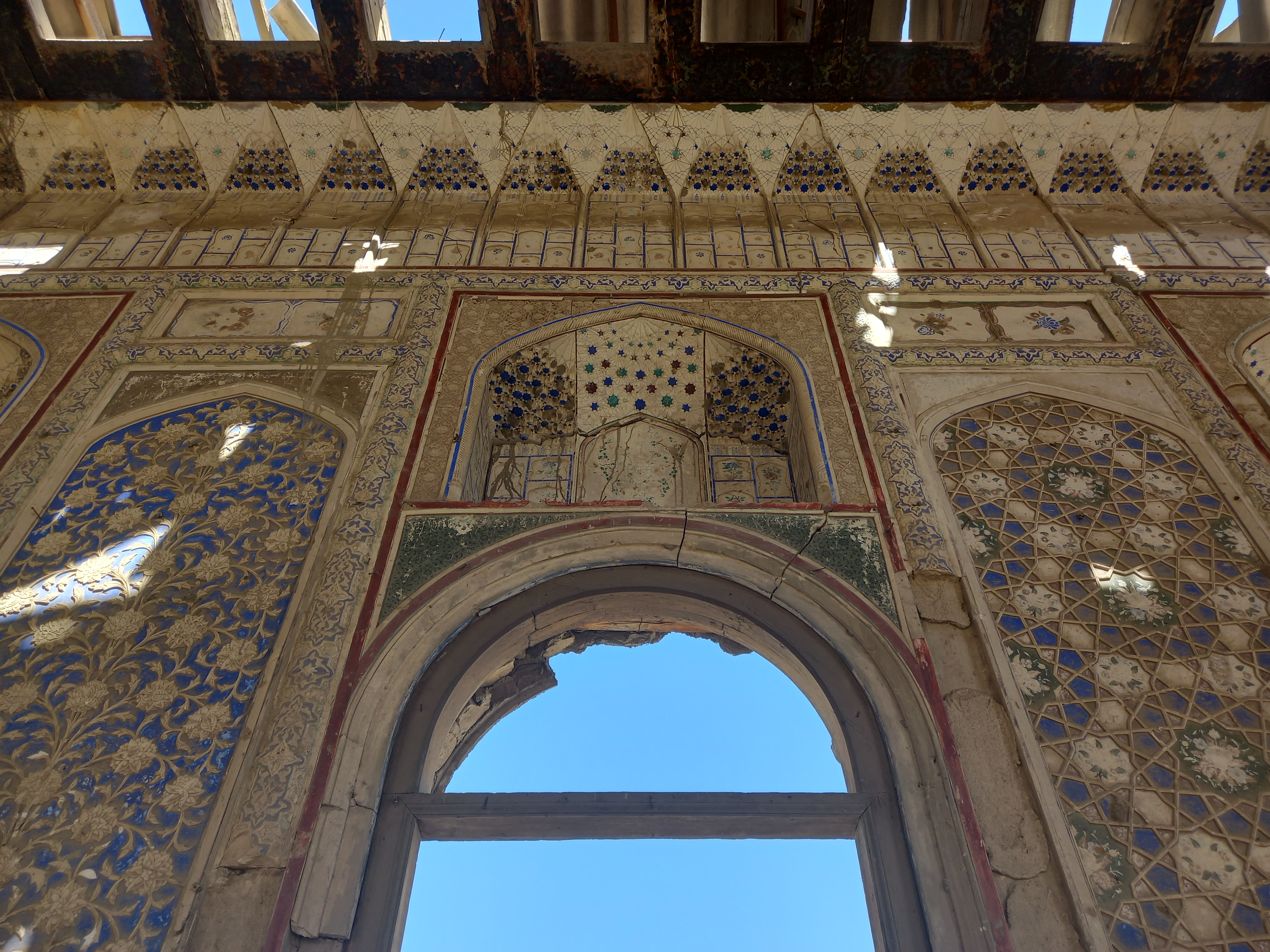
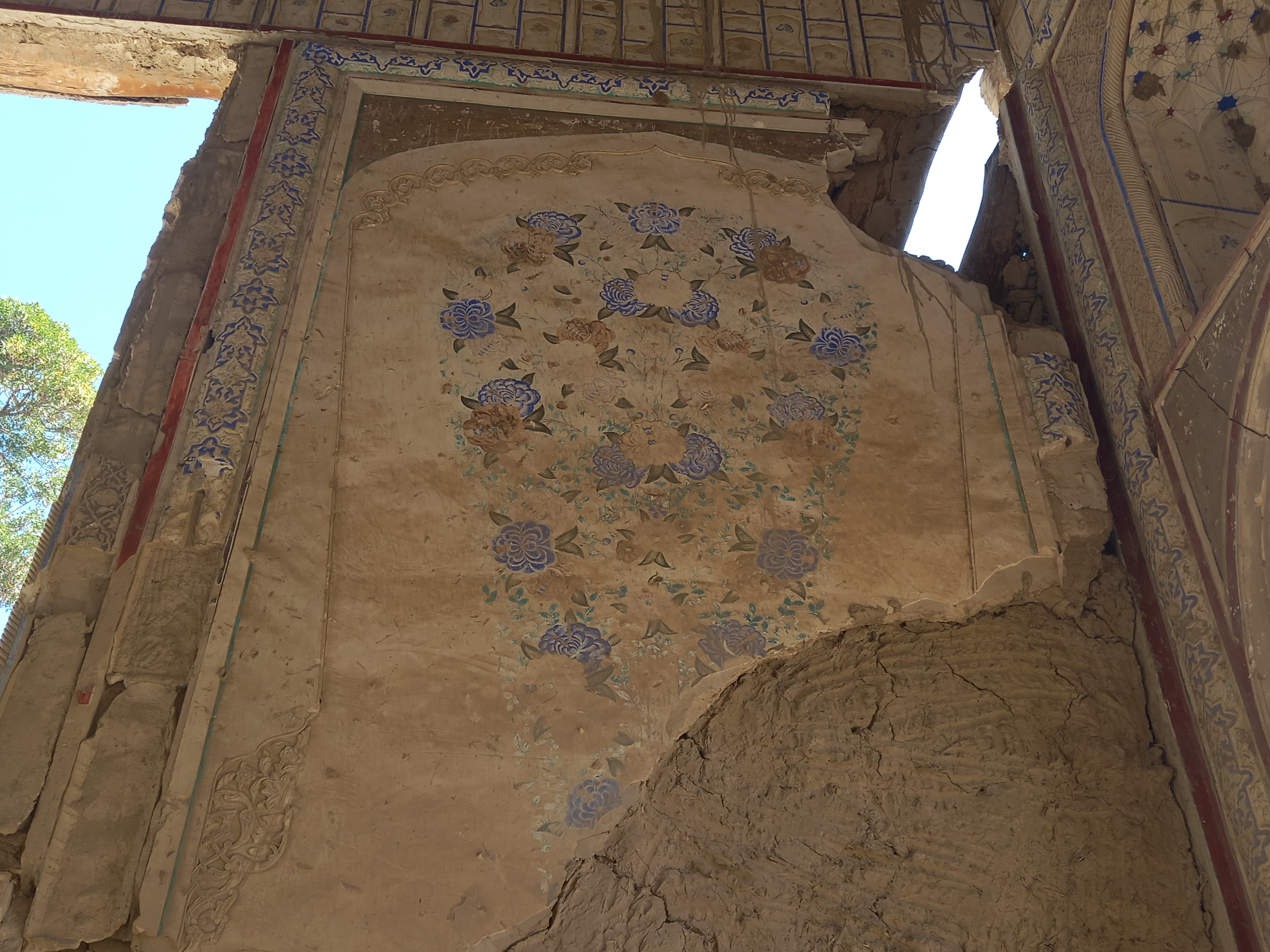
- Interactive map of the Mirzachorbogh residence area

General information
- Status: Historical heritage
- Type: Residence
- Location: Intersections of Amir Olimkhan and Mirzachorbogh Streets, Karmana, Uzbekistan
- Construction started: In 1900
- Construction stopped: In 1905
- Demolished: approximately in 1983

Height
- Height: 11 m (36 ft)

Technical details
- Material: Baked brick, wood, mud, sand
- Floor count: 2

Design and construction
- Developer: Usta Shirin Murodov
- Engineer: Abdurahim Gʻozgʻoniy
- Mirzachorbogʻ qarorgohi xaritada

Mirzachorbogh residence (Mirzachorbogh khangarargohi, Mirza chorbogh palace, Mirza chorbogh; built in 1900-1905) is a palace built in Karmana by the emir of Bukhara, 'Abd al-Ahad Khan. It was considered as a summer residence of the last Bukhara emirs. It is located in the northern part of the town of Karmana, near the Zarafshan river, at the intersection of Amir Olimkhan and Mirzachorbogh streets of the Kokhnakurgan neighborhood. It has become a ruin due to neglect and looting. The fact that the state of the palace is dilapidated and neglected has been covered several times in the media and social networks, in response to which the state authorities have made official statements that the restoration of the palace is included in the state plan, but nothing has actually been done.

The residence of Mirzachorbog is under de jure state protection, de facto neglected.

== Construction ==
=== Choosing a place ===
Several factors were taken into account when choosing a place for the construction of a settlement, such as: the coolness of the air near the Zarafshan River, the fertility of the soil for creating a garden, the constant blowing of a cool wind from the Nurota mountain range, and the ease of hunting.

=== Engineers ===
Abdurahim Ghazgoni was involved to the construction of the Mirzachorbog residence, and the palace was decorated with ganch and carvings by craftsman Shirin Muradov. Najjor Tora from Karmana, master Latif, master Dost, master Sultan Qori took part in its construction. In addition, about a thousand craftsmen were involved in the construction of the palace.

== Architecture ==
The palace was rebuilt mainly in wood and brick style. It is structurally divided into two. The first part is a 6x20 m building with a height of 11 meters, it consists of a two-room hall and a 15-bed hotel. At the top of the corridor was a bolokhana. The interior of both rooms is decorated with carvings and paintings. A large arched mihrab and arches were built on both sides of the hotel. The upper parts of the northern and southern walls of the room have four arches. The eight windows of the building are in the European style, and their upper part is made in the form of a bell. The building is entered from the north side through two doors. The doors are decorated with carvings.

To the west of the hotel there is another ten-room building. Architecturally, it looks a bit plain. The foundation of the building was restored to 1 m of 25 rows of 28x28x4 bricks. The bricks of the 26th row were stacked upright, taking into account their earthquake resistance. Sinch and zavarav are placed in a polygonal shape, their edges are hidden from view. The interior of the building's rooms is decorated in oriental style. There was a 9-12-meter well on the edge of the platform on the surface of the yard, which was later buried.

== State ==
In 1942-1943, the palace was used as barracks for Polish soldiers. After the war, it was used as a collective farm office. From the 1960s to 1974–1975, it was a cocooning office.

In the decree of the President of the Republic of Uzbekistan, signed on May 27, 1999, it was ordered that a program for the renovation of the Mirzachorbog residence, along with a number of historical objects in Karmana, should be developed within two months.

In 2009, it was planned to start the renovation of the palace, but nothing was actually done.

On May 13, 2020, the state institution "Customer service for construction, reconstruction, perfect repair and current repair of objects" under the Ministry of Culture of the Republic of Uzbekistan submitted to the public procurement site the development of project-estimate documents for the repair of the Mirzachorbog residence, along with several historical objects in Uzbekistan. a tender was announced.

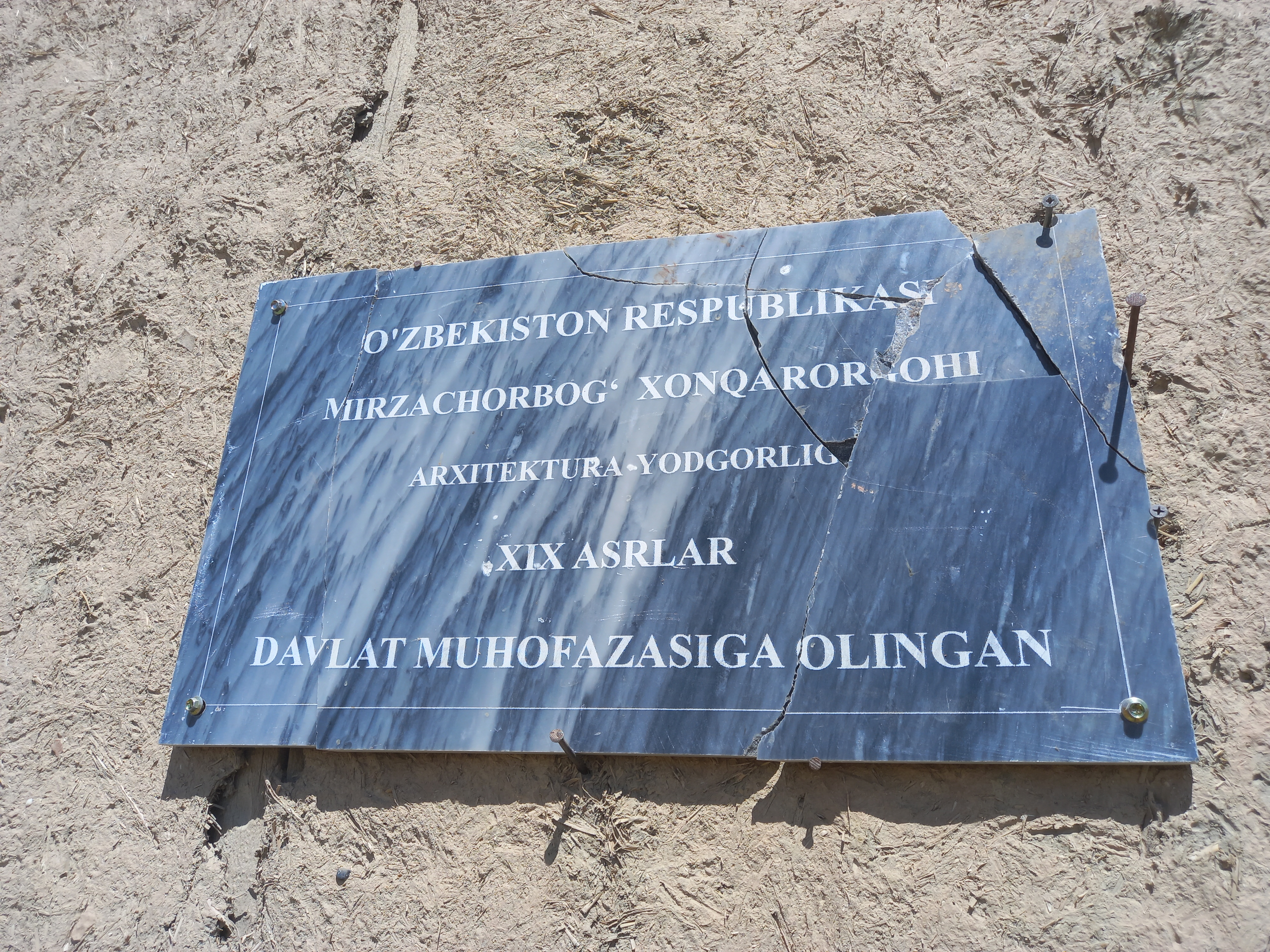
A stone tablet dated 2022 was placed on the southern wall of the Mirzachorbogh residence

Even in 2021, the state of the residence was highlighted on social networks and the official organizations came under sharp criticism from social network users. After that, Navoi Region Tourism and Sports General Administration announced that the renovation of the Mirzachorbog residence was included in the 2021 program, and 3.1 billion soums were allocated for this work. announced that it was separated.

The residence of Mirzachorbog has been kept in ruins today. The courtyard of the palace was lost, the well was buried, part of the palace was destroyed and became a complete ruin. In 2017-2018, when a rumor spread among the people that "a chest of gold was found in Mirzachorbog's residence", the local residents destroyed the wall and ganchkor patterns of the residence, excavated the old throne seat, destroyed the entrance stairs to the rooms, and looked for gold underneath.

In April 2019, the wooden slatted foundation of the palace's waiting room collapsed (it had been leaning for four months). Only fragments of the pattern remained at the crash site. Thick wooden pillars and beams, doors and windows made of precious cedar and walnut wood with carved patterns were transported by local residents.

The dilapidated condition of the palace was covered in the press in different years, but it was not put into practical use. Even the area where the palace is located is not fenced for protection.

== Gallery ==
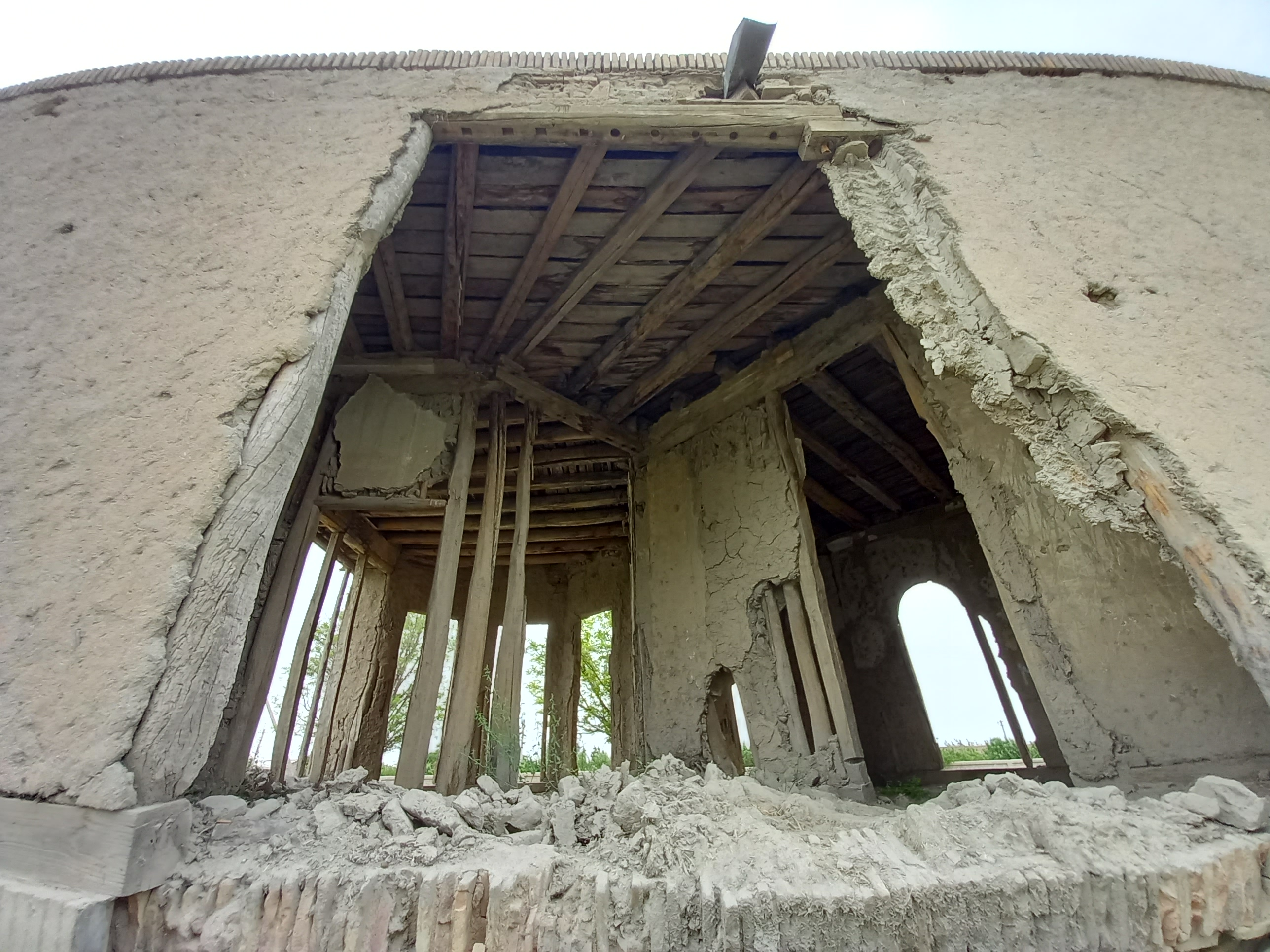

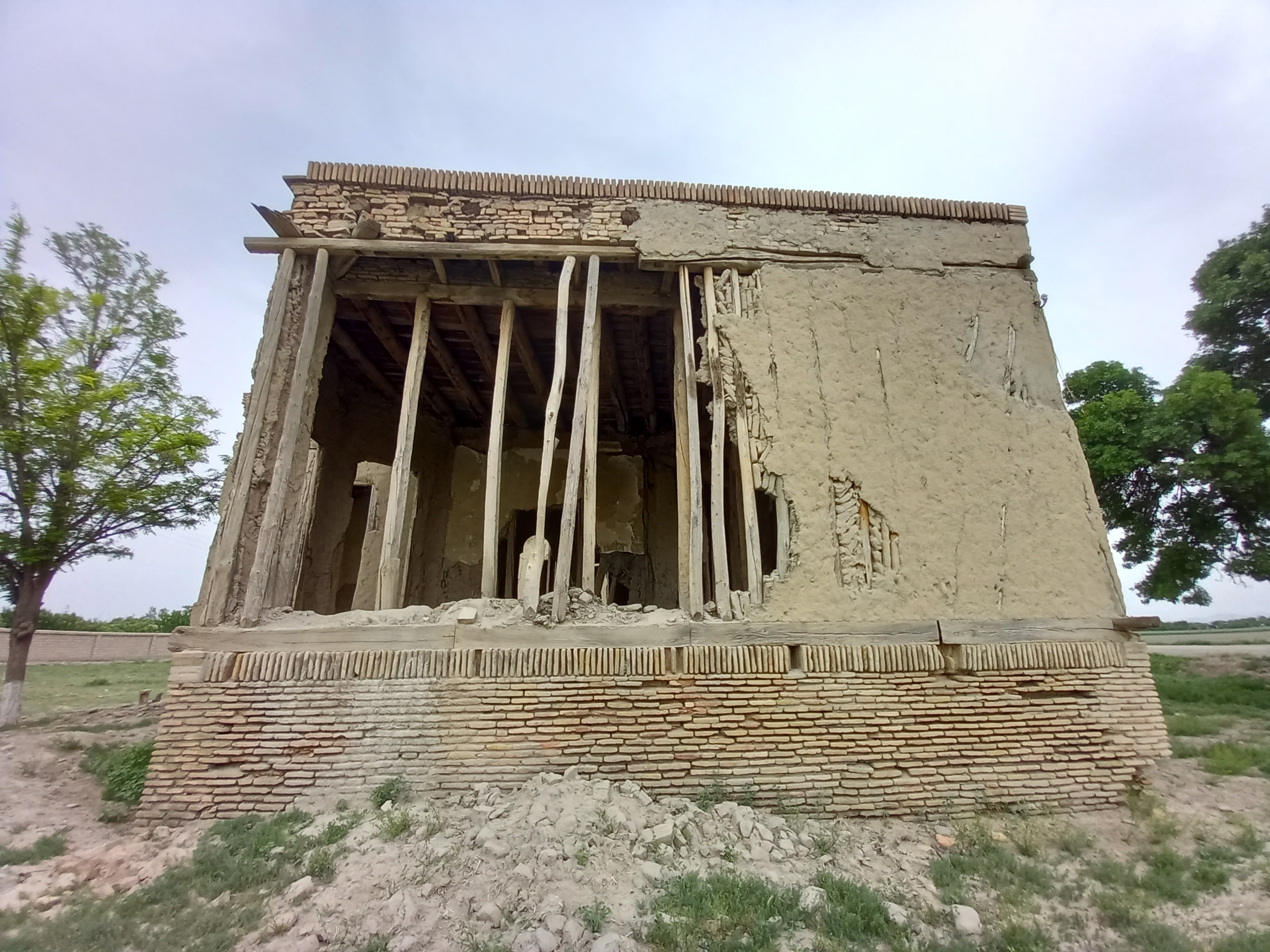

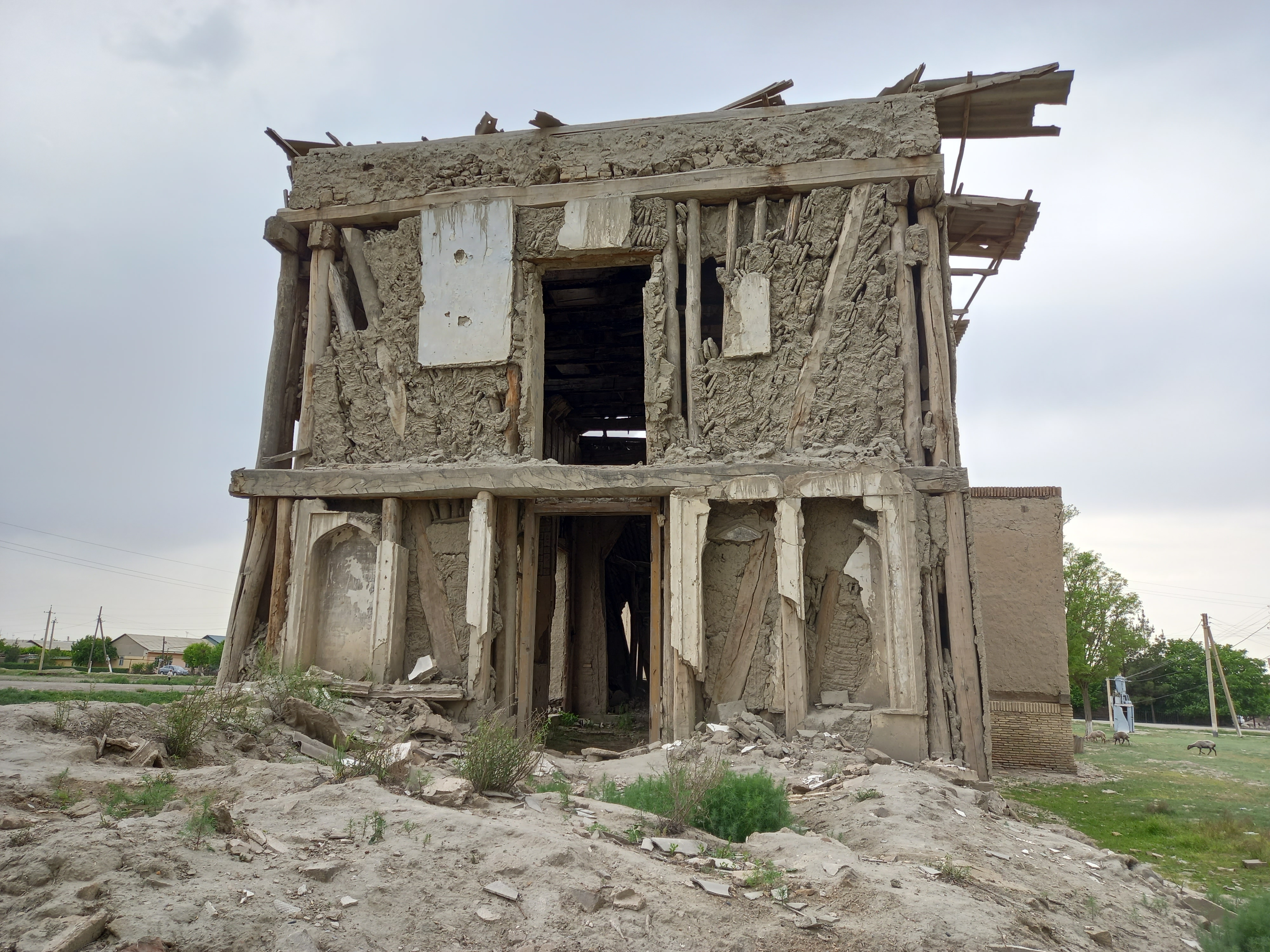

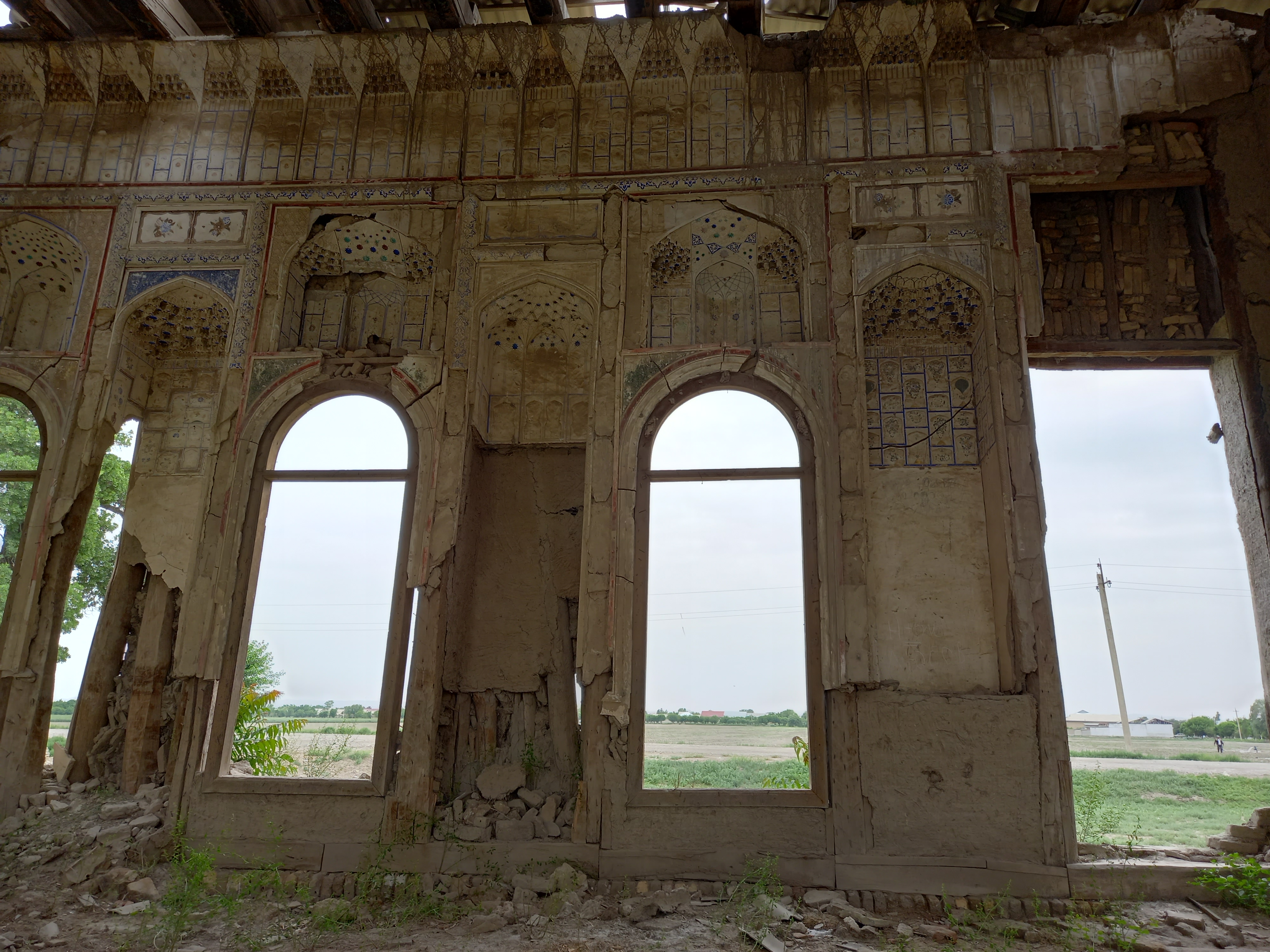

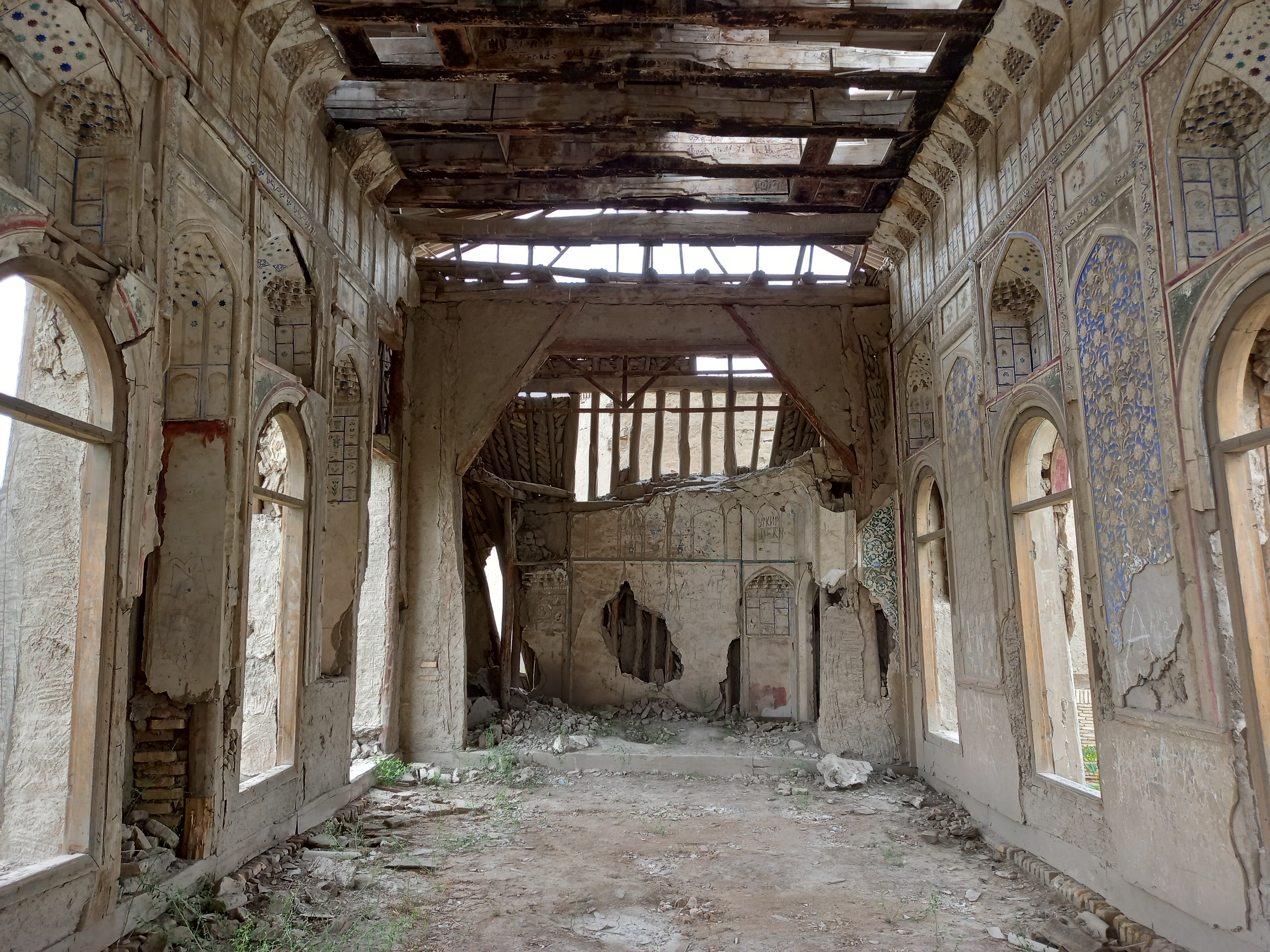

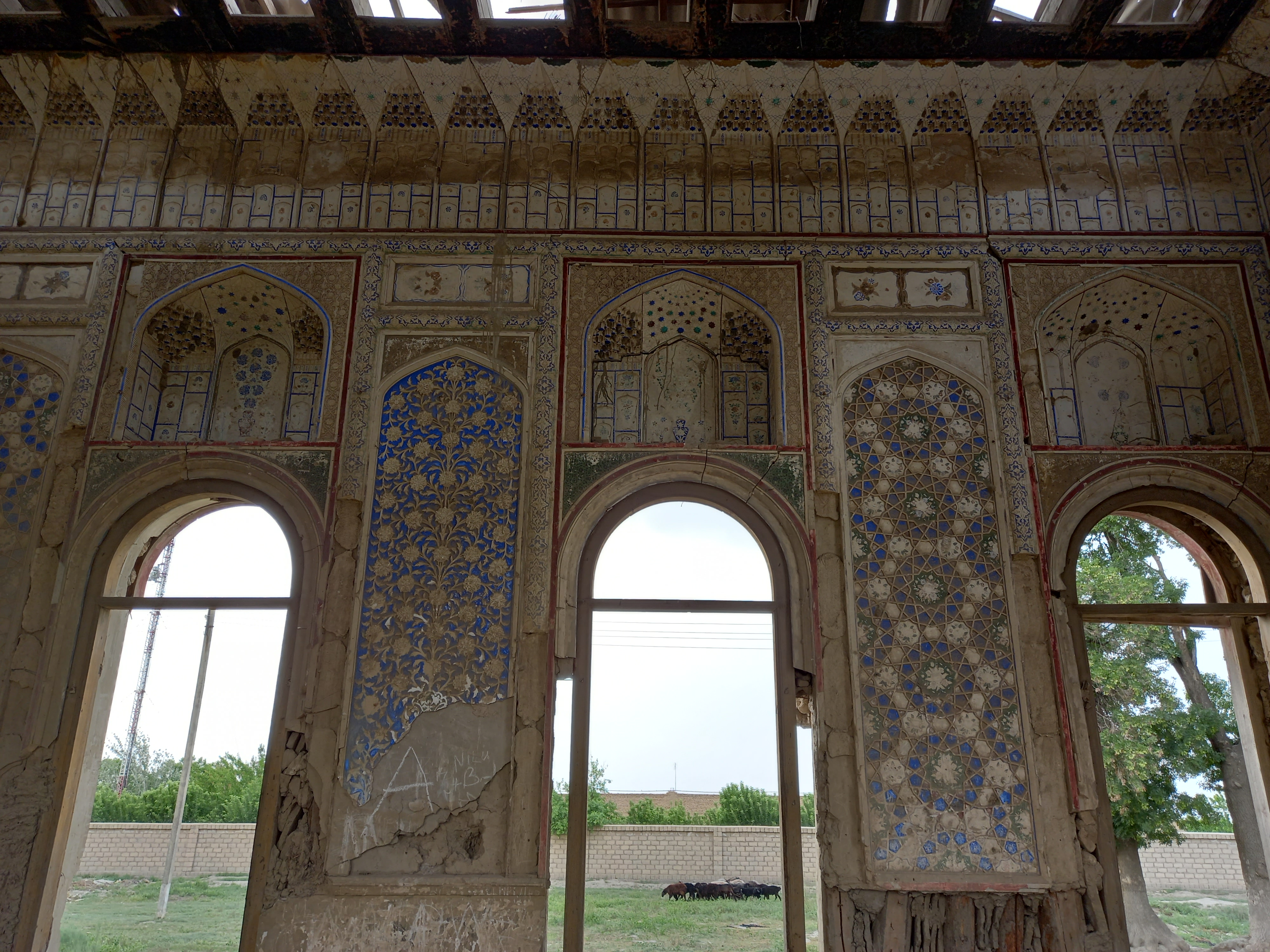

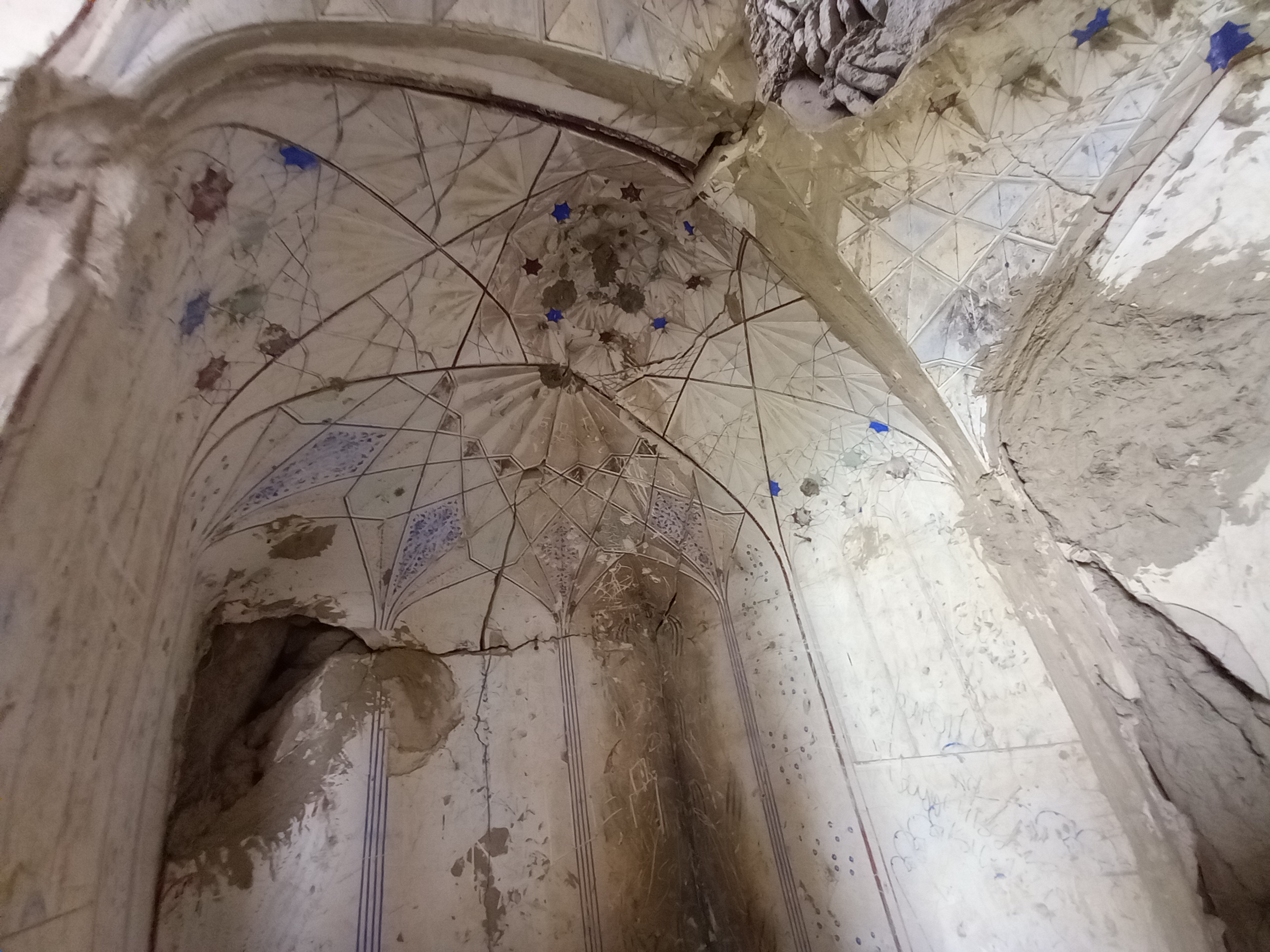

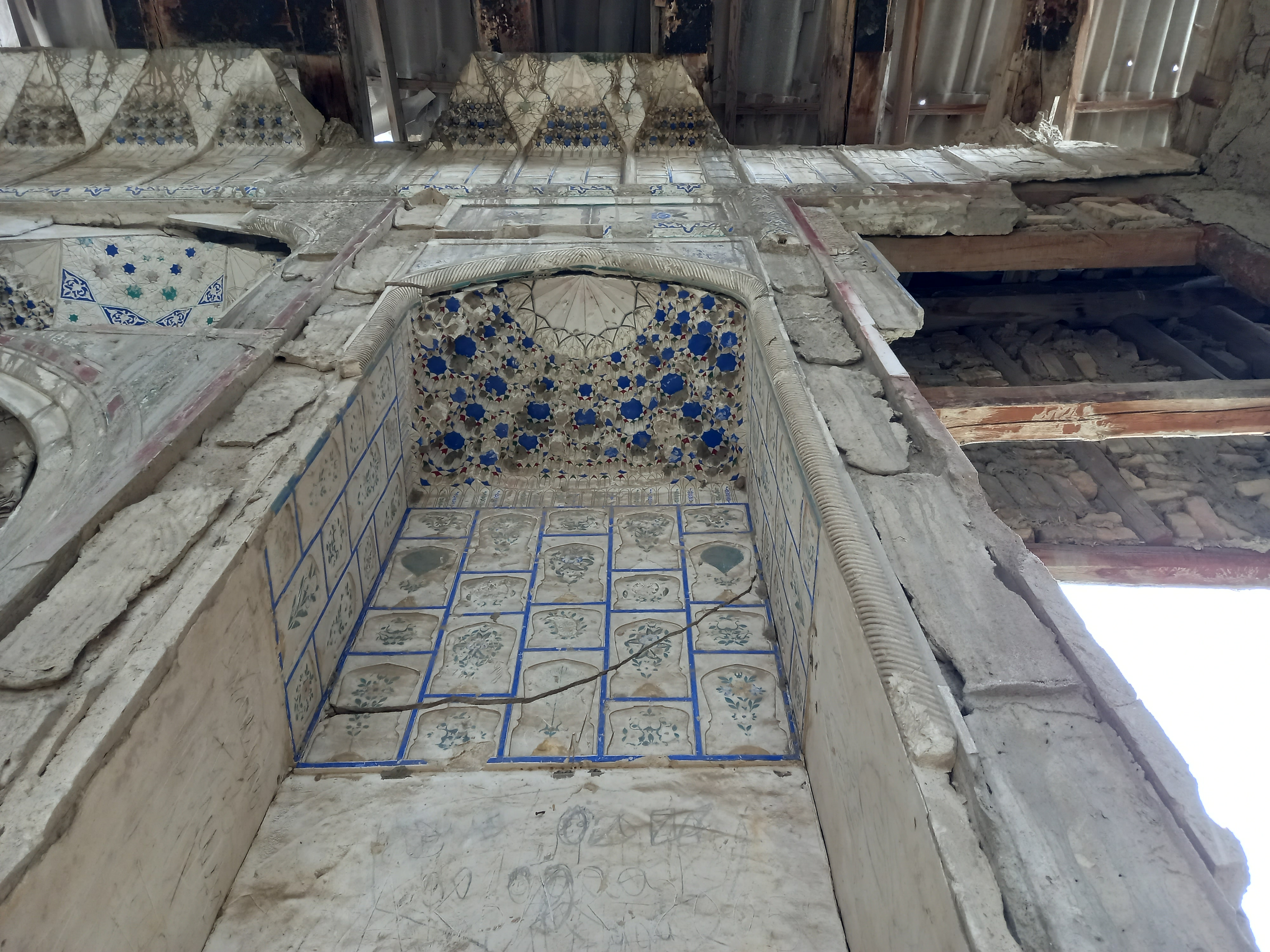
