= Burquttepa =

Object of cultural heritage in Uzbekistan

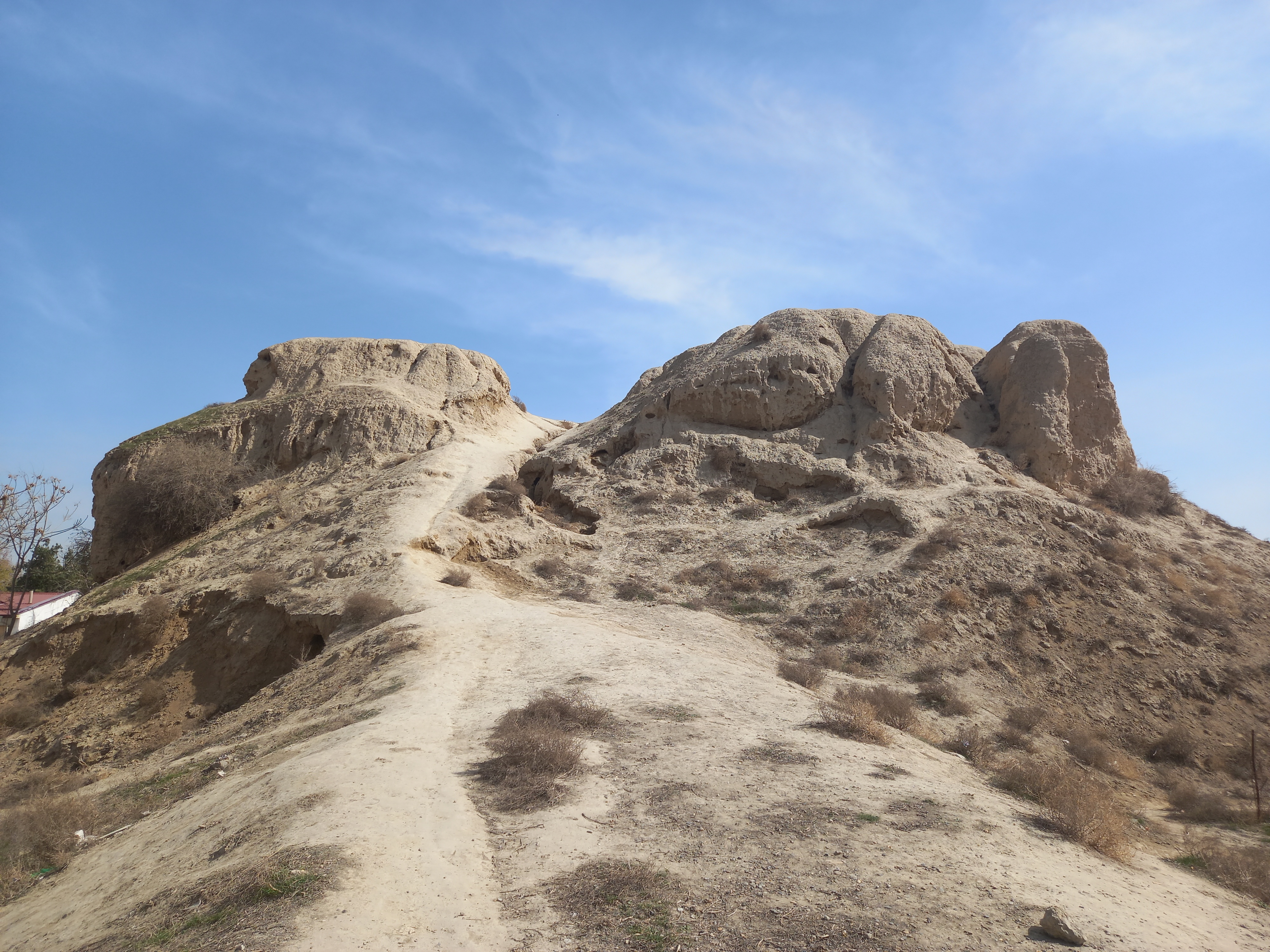
Burquteppa

Burquttepa is an archaeological monument and a site of cultural heritage in Uzbekistan, located in the Karmana District of the Navoiy Region. The site dates back to the periods of the 3rd–2nd and 5th–8th centuries BC. It is situated in the village of Kyzyltom, within the "Yangi Ariq" MFY. The site is state-owned and managed by the Department of Cultural Heritage of the Navoi Region.

On October 4, 2019, Burquttepa was added to Uzbekistan's National List of Real Estate Objects of Material and Cultural Heritage by a decision of the Republic's Cabinet of Ministers, placing it under state protection.

Burquttepa is considered one of the oldest settlements in the Karmana region. It lies 1 km east of the town of Karmana, on the right side of the Bukhara–Samarkand road, near the 6th Secondary School in the Karmana District.

== Archaeological studies ==
A map of Burquttepa

Archaeological excavations were conducted in the Burquttepa area from 1999 to 2002 to determine the age of the town of Karmana. During these excavations, artefacts dating back to the 5th–4th centuries BC were discovered. Among the findings, a hum (jug) from the 4th or 3rd century BC is particularly notable. This jug measures 90 cm in height, with a 30 cm diameter at its narrowest part, a 75 cm diameter at its widest part, and a 60 cm diameter at the mouth. It is now preserved in the State Museum of History and Culture of Navoi Region.

The excavations led to the belief that Burquttepa was once a large citadel and that the ancient town of Karmana was originally located here. Burquttepa consists of an arch and a county. A hum and a pipe, made in the late 1st century BC to early 1st century AD, were uncovered at the site. Archaeologists consider the pipe found in Burquttepa to be one of the oldest artefacts discovered in Western Sogdiana.

The lowest cultural layer of Burquttepa is linked to early periods, such as those of Varakhsha and Poykent, and is thought to date back to the 4th–3rd centuries BC. The next two layers correspond to the 3rd–2nd centuries BC and the 2nd century BC, and are estimated to date from the second half of the 2nd century to the 1st century AD.

In another excavation, objects from the early centuries AD were found in the uppermost horizon of Burquttepa. Notably, traces of low, right-angled defensive walls were identified in the Shahristan square. Ceramic vessel fragments from the 10th–13th centuries were also found in the upper layers. These discoveries are considered significant for determining the historical age of the town of Karmana.

== Bibliography ==
- Zaripov, Azamat; Shernazar, Shoyim (2021). Karmana kechmishi. Toshkent: Sahhof. p. 192. ISBN 978-9943-6665-8-0.
- Xaitova, Olmaxon; Qurbonov, Xurshid (2018). Karmana tarixi. Toshkent: Mashhur-press. p. 216. ISBN 978-9943-5163-5-9.
