= Yoldoshboy Shahrisabziy Madrasa =

Madrasa in Bukhara, Uzbekistan

The Yoldashboy Shahrisabziy Madrasa (Uzbek: Yoʻldoshboy Shahrisabziy madrasasi) was a madrasa in Bukhara, Uzbekistan. The madrasa has not been preserved to this day. The Yoldashboy Shahrisabziy Madrasa was built by Yoldashboy Shahrisabziy during the reign of Amir Abdulahad Khan in the Bukhara Emirate in the 19th century. The scholar Abdusattor Jumanazarov studied a number of waqf documents related to this madrasa and provided information about the madrasa. For example, in the first waqf document, Yoldashboy Shahrisabziy endowed five shops in the Sozangaron passage for the construction of the madrasa on March 16, 1885. Yoldashboy Shahrisabziy also endowed nine thousand tengas to complete the construction of the madrasa. The madrasa was supposed to consist of nine cells and one classroom. If there was any surplus, one shop and one palace had to be purchased. The madrasa had the house of Mir Shamsiddin, son of Mirzo Solih, on the north, and a street on the south and east. The waqf trustee of the madrasa was the endower himself. After him, this duty was performed by the chief of Bukhara. The Yoldashboy Shahrisabziy Madrasa was one of the active educational centers in Bukhara. A number of waqf documents related to the madrasa have been preserved. Mainly, they reflect the material support of the teachers and students of the Yoldashboy Shahrisabziy Madrasa. Two students lived in each cell of the madrasa. Sadri Ziyo wrote that there were nine cells in this Yoldashboy Shahrisabziy Madrasa. The Yoldashboy Shahrisabziy Madrasa consisted of nine cells. This madrasa was built in the style of Central Asian architecture. The madrasa was made of baked brick, wood, stone and plaster.
