= Urda =

Urda may refer to:

- Patrick J. Urda (born 1976), American judge
- Urd (Norse mythology), of which Urda is an alternative spelling
- 167 Urda, an asteroid
- Urda (cheese), a type of cheese in the Balkans
- Urda (anime), an anime about time travel and Nazis
- Urda (journal), a Norwegian antiquities and history journal
- Urda (Tashkent), Uzbekistan, a district of Tashkent
- Urda, Toledo, a Spanish municipality
- Urda Arneberg (1929–2000), Norwegian actress
- Urda (isopod), an extinct genus related to the family Gnathiidae
- Urda railway station, northern Estonia
- Urda Ridge, a ridge in the South Shetland Islands of Antarctica
- U.R.D.A., a fictional terrorist organization in Crisis Zone
