= Mulla Jan Mirza Sabzavari =

Mulla Jan Mirza Sabzavari was the grand vizier of the Emirate of Bukhara from 1889 to 1905. Like his predecessor Muhammadi-biy Qoshbegi, he was also an Iranian Shia Muslim who had been purchased as a slave by Muzaffar bin Nasrullah (r. 1860–1885).

== Sources ==
- Uyama, Tomohiko (2012). Asiatic Russia: Imperial Power in Regional and International Contexts. Routledge. ISBN 978-1136620102.
