= Qosim Sheikh Complex =

Architectural ensemble in Karmana, Uzbekistan

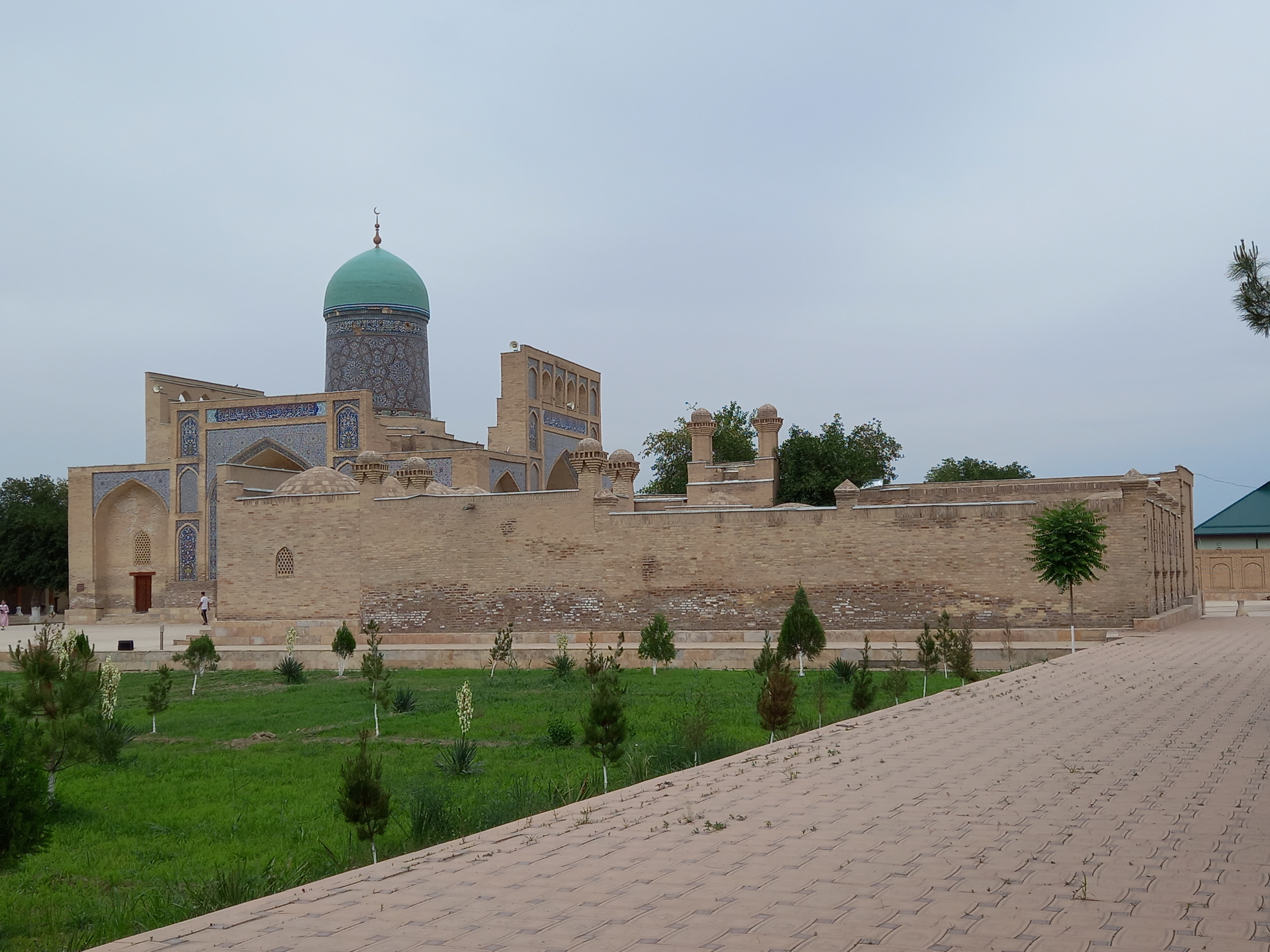
- Qosim Sheikh Complex
- Interactive map of the Qosim Sheikh Complex area

General information
- Architectural style: Eastern
- Location: Karmana, Navoiy Region, Uzbekistan
- Coordinates: 40.1332°N 65.3675°E
- Year built: 16th–20th centuries
- Construction started: 1558
- Construction stopped: 1911
- Renovated: 2000–2001

Technical details
- Material: Brick, wood, plaster, marble, turquoise tiles

Design and construction
- Architects: Abdulla Khan II, Olim Khan

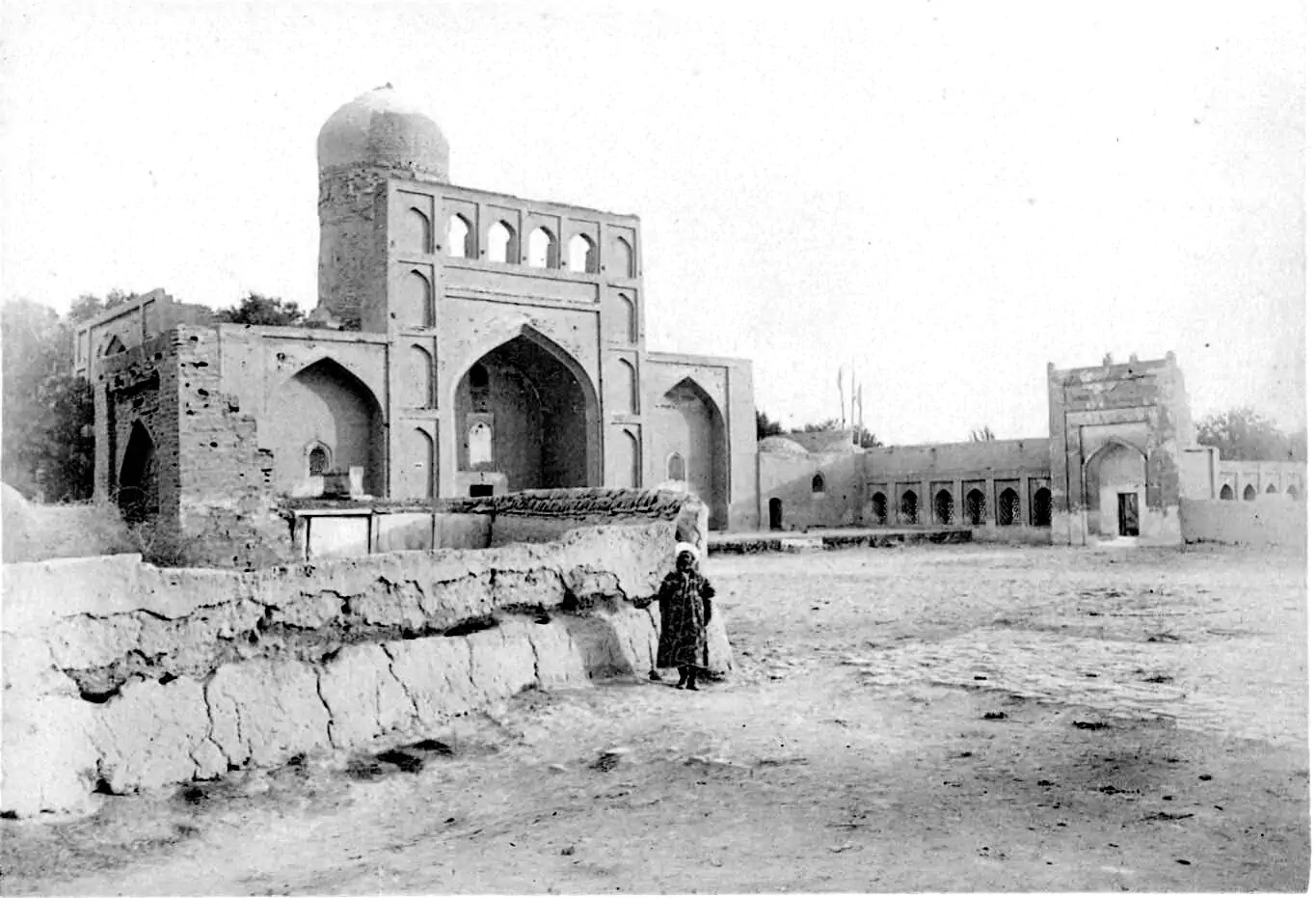
Qosim Sheikh Complex. 1887

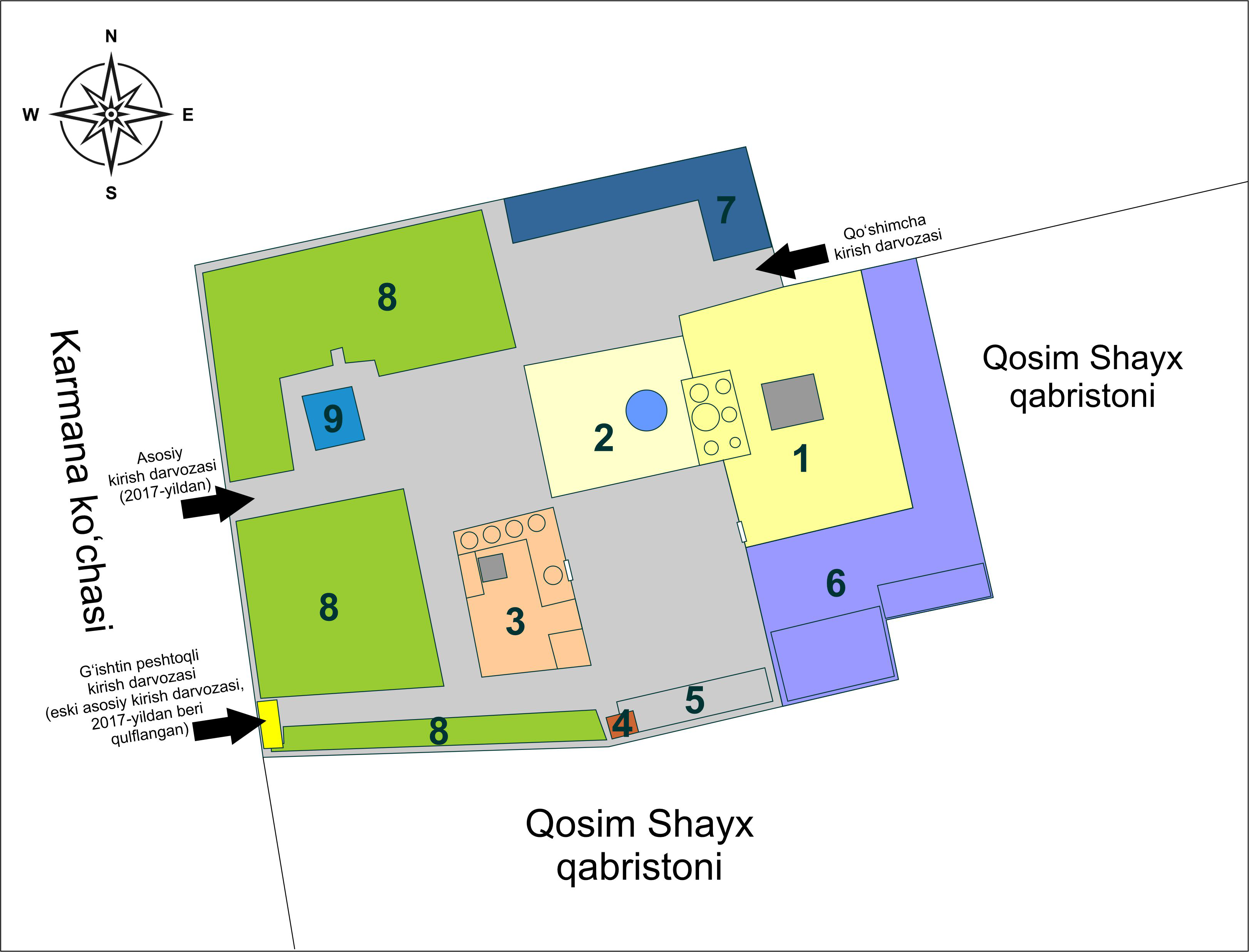
Map of the Qosim Sheikh Complex: 1. Qosim Sheikh Mausoleum; 2. Qosim Sheikh Khanqah; 3. Abdulahad Khan Mausoleum; 4. Surviving room; 5. Foundations of the destroyed rooms; 6. Mosque ablution room; 7. Mosque clerics’ rooms; 8. Crop fields; 9. Pond

The Qosim Sheikh Complex (16th–20th centuries) is an architectural ensemble located in the city of Karmana, Navoiy Region, Uzbekistan. The complex includes the Qosim Sheikh Khanqah (built in 1558), the Qosim Sheikh Mausoleum, the Abdulahad Khan Mausoleum (built in 1911), and other architectural monuments. The Qosim Sheikh Complex and most of the monuments there are named after Qosim Sheikh Azizon, who lived in Karmana in the 15th century.

The monuments in the complex were restored in 2000–2001.

== Qosim Sheikh Khanqah ==
The Qosim Sheikh Khanqah (also known as Qosim Sheikh Azizon Khanqah) is an architectural monument built in 1558 by Bukhara Khan Abdulla Khan II in Karmana. This khanqah was where Qosim Sheikh taught in Karmana.

Historians estimate that the khanqah was built in 15–20 years. The khanqah has three sides (north, south, and west) covered with domes and vaults. The length and width of the khanqah are 25 meters each. The interior of the khanqah has six rooms and a large prayer hall in the center, with a mihrab on the south side. There are four octagonal cells on each side of the building, measuring about 6x6 meters each. On the east side, there is a 6x4 meters cooling room. The roofs of each room are covered with wooden domes. The interior of the khanqah is decorated with plaster carvings. The building is covered with five domes. The central dome is 12 meters high from the ground, and there are four domes on each side, 8 meters high from the ground. The thickness of the walls of the khanqah is 80 centimeters.

The khanqah has a high dome in the shape of a minaret on the outside, which stands out from the rest of the building. The dome is about 9 m higher than the building. There are air ducts between the walls of the dome, which serve to maintain a moderate temperature inside the room in hot and cold days. The top part of the outer side of the dome is covered with turquoise tiles. The lower part has inscriptions of Quranic verses in Kufic script.

== Qosim Sheikh Mausoleum ==
Qosim Sheikh Azizon died in 1580 or 1581, at the age of about 80–81, in his birthplace Marjonkhotin village. His body was buried on the east side of his khanqah, according to his will.

After Qosim Sheikh's death, a 2.5 meters high brick wall (Abdulla Khan brick) was built on the east side of the Qosim Sheikh Khanqah, and a tombstone was erected for Qosim Sheikh's grave. The tombstone measures 9x10 meters. There are three rooms with front porches, measuring 8x15 meters, for the visitors who come to this place.

During the Soviet period, the grave was neglected and the marble stones were taken away.

== Abdulahad Khan Mausoleum ==
In 1911, Bukhara Emir Abdulahad Khan died in his palace near Karmana. His son Olim Khan buried his father on the southwest side of the Qosim Sheikh Khanqah and built a mausoleum around the grave.

== Other structures in the complex ==
On the south side of the Qosim Sheikh Complex, there are kitchens measuring 4 metres × 17 meters, 35 meters away from the khanqah. Only one room measuring 4 meters × 4 meters has survived to this day.

In 2019, a wide wooden porch with eastern-style carvings was built on the front part of the administrative buildings on the north side of the complex.
