= Muhammadi-biy Qoshbegi =

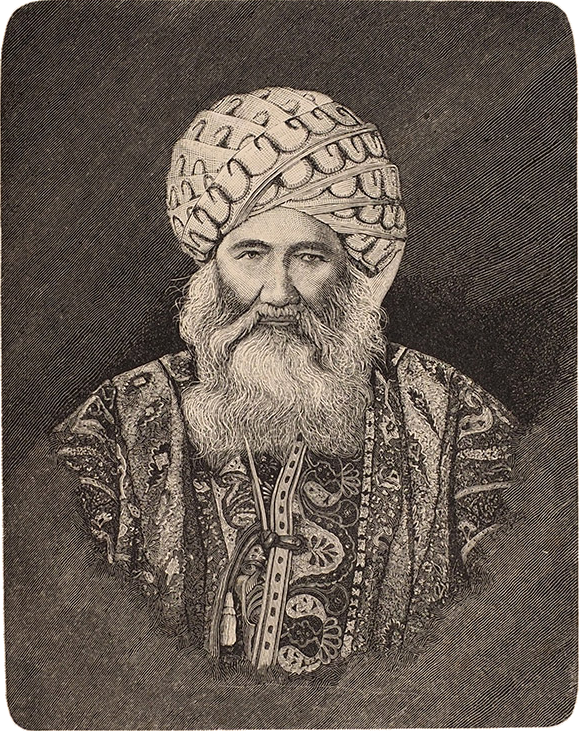
Illustration of Muhammadi-biy Qoshbegi

Muhammadi-biy Qoshbegi was the grand vizier of the Emirate of Bukhara from 1872 until his death in 1889. Of Iranian Shia slave origin, he was the father of Muhammad Sharif-biy Inaq and grandfather of Astanaqul-biy Qoshbegi. After his death, he was succeeded by another Iranian Shia, Mulla Jan Mirza Sabzavari.

== Sources ==
- Becker, Seymour (2004). Russia's Protectorates in Central Asia: Bukhara and Khiva, 1865-1924. Routledge. ISBN 978-0415328036.
- Uyama, Tomohiko (2012). Asiatic Russia: Imperial Power in Regional and International Contexts. Routledge. ISBN 978-1136620102.
