= Astanaqul-biy Qoshbegi =

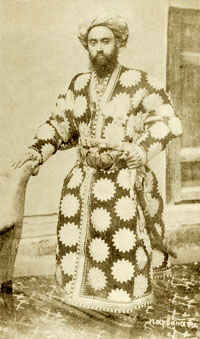
Photograph of Astanaqul-biy Qoshbegi, dated 1880

Astanaqul-biy Qoshbegi was the grand vizier of the Emirate of Bukhara from 1905 to 1910. Of Iranian slave origin, he was the son of Muhammad Sharif-biy Inaq and grandson of Muhammadi-biy Qoshbegi.

== Sources ==
- Becker, Seymour (2004). Russia's Protectorates in Central Asia: Bukhara and Khiva, 1865-1924. Routledge. ISBN 978-0415328036.
- Uyama, Tomohiko (2012). Asiatic Russia: Imperial Power in Regional and International Contexts. Routledge. ISBN 978-1136620102.
