= Muhammad-Siddiq Hayrat =

- Born: 1878 Bukhara, Emirate of Bukhara
- Died: 1902 (aged 23–24) Bukhara, Emirate of Bukhara
- Occupation: Poet
- Language: Persian

Muhammad-Siddiq Hayrat (Persian: محمد صدیق حیرت: 1878–1902) was a poet in the Emirate of Bukhara, who is considered one of the leading figures in 19th century Persian poetry.

== Sources ==
- Allworth, Edward A. (2003). The Personal History of a Bukharan Intellectual: The Diary of Muḥammad Sharīf-i Ṣadr-i Ziyā. Brill Publishers. ISBN 978-9004131613.
- Borjan, Habib (2003). "Ḥayrat, Moḥammad Ṣeddiq Moḥammad". In Yarshater, Ehsan (ed.). Encyclopædia Iranica (Online ed.). Encyclopædia Iranica Foundation. ISBN 978-0710090959.
