= ʽAbd al-Ahad Khan =

Emir of Bukhara from 1885 to 1910

Abd al-Ahad Khan
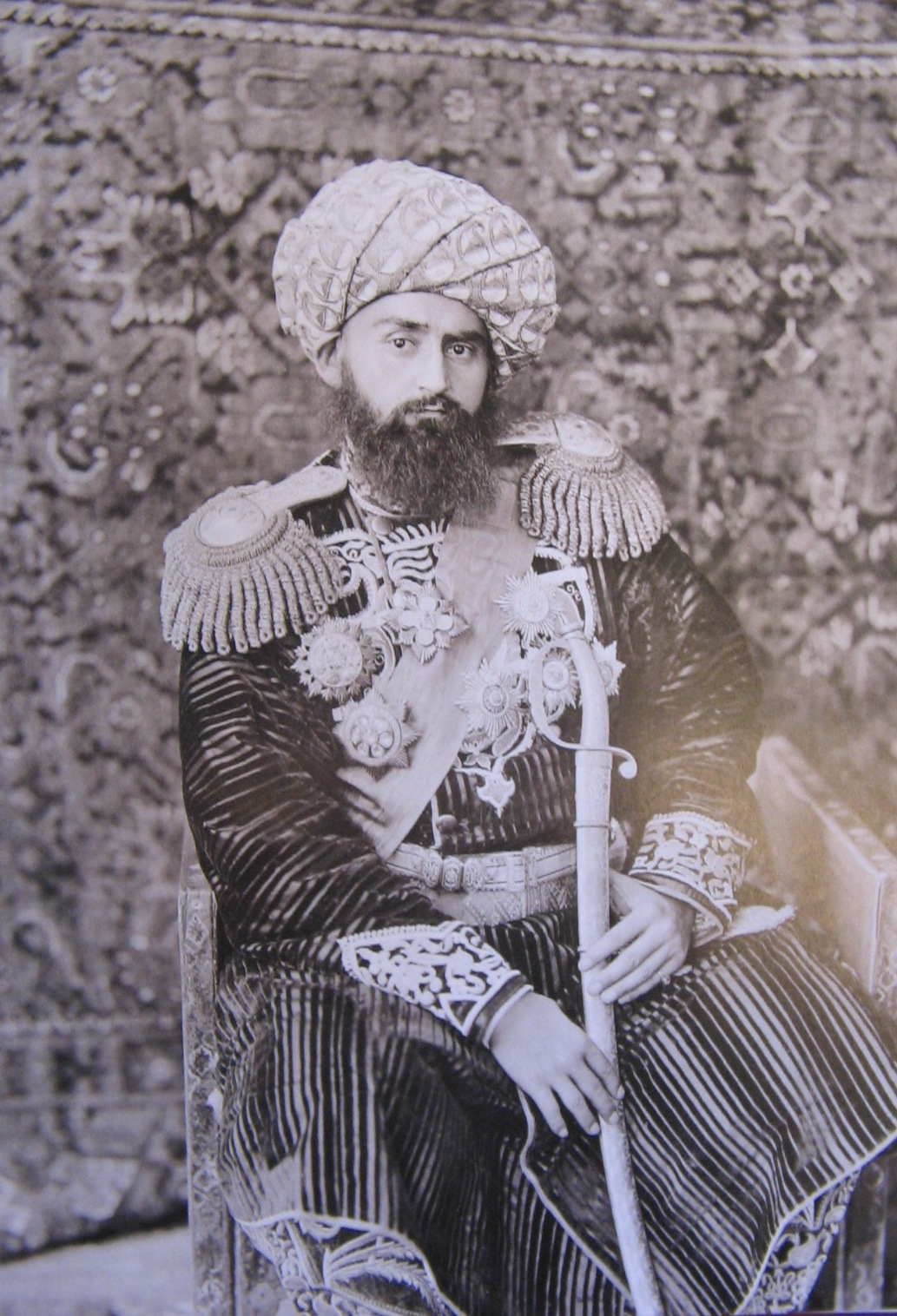
- Abd al-Ahad in 1900/1901

Emir of Bukhara
- Reign: 4 November 1885 – 23 December 1910
- Predecessor: Muzaffar bin Nasrullah
- Successor: Sayyid Mir Muhammad Alim Khan
- Born: 26 March 1859
- Died: 23 December 1910 (aged 51)
- Issue: Sayyid Mir Muhammad Alim Khan
- Dynasty: Manghit
- Father: Muzaffar bin Nasrullah

Abd al-Ahad Khan was the penultimate emir of the Emirate of Bukhara from 4 November 1885 to 23 December 1910. He was the son and successor of Muzaffar bin Nasrullah (r. 1860–1885). He was succeeded by his son Sayyid Mir Muhammad Alim Khan, the last Emir of Bukhara and the last Borjigin monarch to rule in Central Asia.

== Background and early life ==
Abd al-Ahad Khan was the fifth son of Muzaffar bin Nasrullah (r. 1860–1885), the emir of the Emirate of Bukhara. His mother was a slave from Iran. Since 1868, the Emirate of Bukhara had been a protectorate of the Russian Empire. Abd al-Ahad attended a military school in Russia and rose to the position of adjutant general in the Russian Army. In 1871, Abd al-Ahad was appointed as the beg of Kermine, a position he held until his later succession. Although he had already been chosen by his father as his successor a decade earlier, in 1883 he was sent to Moscow to confirm his position as heir. Abd al-Ahad went there during the coronation of Alexander III (r. 1881–1894), where he on behalf of his father gave expensive presents and 100,000 rubles in gold.

== Reign ==
After the death of his father on 31 October 1885, Abd al-Ahad succeeded him on 4 November. Because of his Russian education, Abd al-Ahad understood the modern world, and thus the liberals of the Bukharan Enlightenment hoped that he would implement reforms. His reign saw Bukhara subjected to growing Russian impact in everyday affairs. After his succession, Abd al-Ahad abolished slavery at the request of the Russians. He stopped the practice of executing people by impalement or hurling from the top of the Kalyan Minaret, closed the underground prison in the fortress at Bukhara, and forbade the practice of bacha bazi (young boys dressed as girls and trained as dancers for homosexual purposes) from being displayed in public. This had a minor impact on the Bukhara slave trade, as it survived in debt bondage, household labor, and the staffing of the emir's harem.

Since the start of the 19th-century, Iranian Shia Muslims of slave origin had formed the majority of the emir's court servants, as well as some high-ranking administration and military positions. A prominent family of that background was that of Muhammadi-biy Qoshbegi, who had been serving as grand vizier since 1872. In 1888, his son Muhammad Sharif-biy Inaq was murdered. The Russian authorities took this situation very seriously since he had been one of their most trustworthy supporters. They started looking into the case, even suspecting of Abd al-Ahad of being connected. After Abd al-Ahad was proven innocent, he appointed Muhammad Sharif-biy Inaq's son Astanaqul-biy Qoshbegi as his grand treasurer (divanbigi-yi kalan or zakatchi-yi kalan). According to the contemporary writer Mirza Azim Sami, who was critical of Shias, this appointment "became a cause for the advancement and stabilization of the rule" of the Shias. Astanaqul-biy was responsible for both commercial administration and diplomatic relations with the Russians. He was considered a valuable ally to the Russians, despite occasionally pushing back against their demands.

Despite his willingness to implement reforms, Abd al-Ahad was prevented from doing so by Chief Justice Badr al-Din-i Khatlani and the intolerant clergy. Due to pressure from the clergy, Abd al-Ahad lost hope in his plans and moved from Bukhara to Kermine in 1897. Abd al-Ahad died on 23 December 1910. He was succeeded by his son Sayyid Mir Muhammad Alim Khan.

Abd al-Ahad composed poems in Persian, which was generally well-regarded, with a number receiving special acclaim among Bukhara's scholarly circles. By the end of the Emirate of Bukhara, panegyrics by Central Asian poets had become excessively flattering. In a qasida by Sadr-i Ziya, Abd al-Ahad is referred to as "the lord of Solomon's habits and Darius's charisma".

== Sources ==
- Allworth, Edward A. (2003). The Personal History of a Bukharan Intellectual: The Diary of Muḥammad Sharīf-i Ṣadr-i Ziyā. Brill Publishers. ISBN 978-9004131613.
- Becker, Seymour (2004). Russia's Protectorates in Central Asia: Bukhara and Khiva, 1865-1924. Routledge. ISBN 978-0415328036.
- Uyama, Tomohiko (2012). Asiatic Russia: Imperial Power in Regional and International Contexts. Routledge. ISBN 978-1136620102.
- Wilde, Andreas (2020). "Manghit dynasty". In Fleet, Kate; Krämer, Gudrun; Matringe, Denis; Nawas, John; Rowson, Everett (eds.). Encyclopaedia of Islam (3rd ed.). Brill Online. ISSN 1873-9830.

Preceded by Muzaffar bin Nasrullah	Emir of Bukhara; 4 November 1885 – 23 December 1910	Succeeded by Sayyid Mir Muhammad Alim Khan
