= Urda (Tashkent) =

District of Tashkent, Uzbekistan

Coordinates: 41°19′20.0″N 69°15′42.7″E

- City district
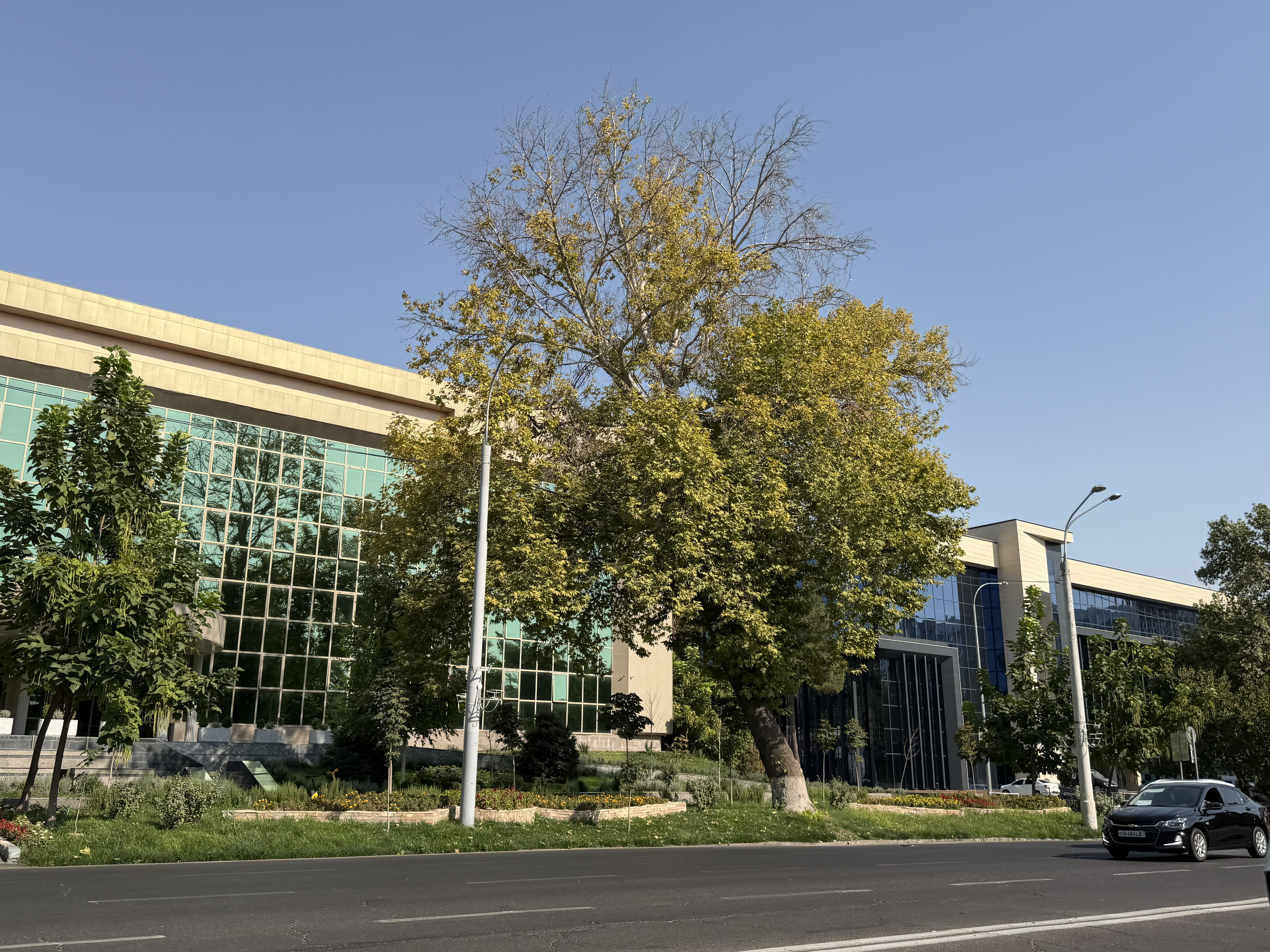
- Interactive map of Urda
- Country: Uzbekistan
- City: Tashkent

Urda is a district of Tashkent, Uzbekistan, near the intersection of Alishera Navoi Avenue and the Ankhor Canal.

== History ==
The name of the district is derived from the military fortress of Urda, which was originally located in this area as part of the old city walls. After Tashkent became part of the Khanate of Kokand, the new ruler of the city destroyed the old Urda and erected a new citadel on the left bank of the Ankhor Canal, not far from the former Sheikhantaur Gate. Subsequently, the area was the main transport corridor connecting the new city with its old parts. The first modern bridge over the canal, Urdinsky Bridge, was built in Urda.
