= Dost Chuhra Oga Madrasah =

Madrasa in Bukhara, Uzbekistan

General information
- Architectural style: Central Asian architecture
- Location: Bukhara Khanate, Uzbekistan
- Year built: 16th century
- Owner: Do'stim

Technical details
- Material: brick, wood, concrete and stone
- Size: 10 rooms

Dost Chuhra Oga Madrasah is located in Bukhara, Uzbekistan. The madrasah has not been preserved today.

== Background ==
Dost Chuhra Oga Madrasah was built by Dostmirza in 1585 during the reign of Bukhara Khanate, Abdullah Khan ibn Iskandar Khan, in the Dost Chuhra Oga guzar. According to Abdurauf Fitrat, the amount of the annual endowment was 40,000 tanga. Research scientist Abdusattor Jumanazarov studied a number of foundation documents related to this madrasah and provided information related to the madrasah. The foundation document of this madrasah has been preserved in two copies. Both foundation documents are copies, copied during the reign of Amir Shahmurad, the emir of Bukhara. The madrasah is made of adobe bricks, concrete, wood and stone. There was a street to the west of the madrasah, courtyards and streets of Mirza Shirin ibn Mirza Bahadir and Toqlibek and others to the north, courtyards to the east and a street to the south.

The madrasah foundation donated two attar shops in Dost Chuhra Oga Guzari and one in Registon, 60 plots of land in Sariosia district, 350 plots in Dashtivan village, 282 plots in Zhiyan Ali robot, 350 plots in Rivdiy village and 220 plots in other regions for the madrasah. The founder of the madrasah was Do'ştim, who was one of Abdullah Khan's closest people. Therefore, Abdullah Khan II appointed him to the position of chuhra oga. The Chuhras were special soldiers who ensured the safety of the Khan. He even served as an ambassador. Abdullah Khan II sent him as an ambassador to Kashgar in 1587. Sadri Zia wrote that there were 10 rooms in this madrasah. Dost Chuhra Oga madrasah consisted of 10 rooms. This madrasah was built in the style of Central Asian architecture. The madrasah is built of brick, wood, stone and concrete.

== See also ==
- Mirza Ubayd Madrasah
- Ja'farkhoja Naqib Madrasah
- Jannatmakon Madrasah
- Domulla Sher Madrasah
