= Gharibiya Madrasah =

Madrasa in Bukhara, Uzbekistan

- Uzbek: Gʻaribiya Madrasasi

General information
- Type: Madrasah
- Architectural style: Central Asian architecture
- Location: Bukhara Khanate, Uzbekistan

Technical details
- Material: brick, wood, stone and ganch
- Size: 52 rooms

Gharibiya Madrasah is a madrasa in Bukhara, Uzbekistan.

== History ==
Gharibiya madrasa was built under Haji Amonboy and is one of the oldest madrasas in Bukhara. Many great scholars and saints have graduated from this madrasa and they later taught students. According to the sources, Khwaja Muhammad Bahovuddin Naqshband was educated in this madrasah. The Gharibiya madrasah belongs to the third level of the highest category and has the property of the foundation. Research scientist Abdusattor Jumanazarov studied a number of foundation documents related to this madrasah and provided information related to the madrasah. According to Abdurauf Fitrat, the annual endowment of the madrasah is 40,000 tenge. Abdusattor Jumanazarov identified many foundation documents related to this madrasah. In the first foundation document, 100 tanobs of land in Qorakoʻl District were endowed for this madrasah in 1883–1884. The copy of this endowment document is certified with the seal of Qazikalon Muhammad Sharif. In the third foundation document, 100 acres of land were dedicated to this madrasah in the district of Sariosiya, Komot district, and the original copy of the document has not been preserved. The madrasah waqf document also contains information about the mudarris and their salaries. In particular, Musokhoja's salary was 77 gilts, Mullah Hasan's salary was 40 gilts. Waqf documents also contain information about students who studied at the madrasah. Classes were held in the Gharibiya madrasah until the Shura era. According to Olga Sukhareva, this madrasa is located in Gharibiya Guzar and several rooms have been preserved. Sadri Zia wrote that there were 52 rooms in this madrasah.

== Architecture ==
Gharibiya Madrasah consisted of 52 rooms. This madrasa was built in the style of Central Asian architecture. The madrasah is built of brick, wood, stone and ganch.

== See also ==
- Joyborcha Madrasah
- Dahmayi Behishtian
- Muhammad Nazar Parvonachi Madrasah
- Dost Chuhra Oga Madrasah
