= Mulla Ernazarbek madrasah =

Madrasa in Bukhara, Uzbekistan

- Mulla Ernazarbek madrasasi
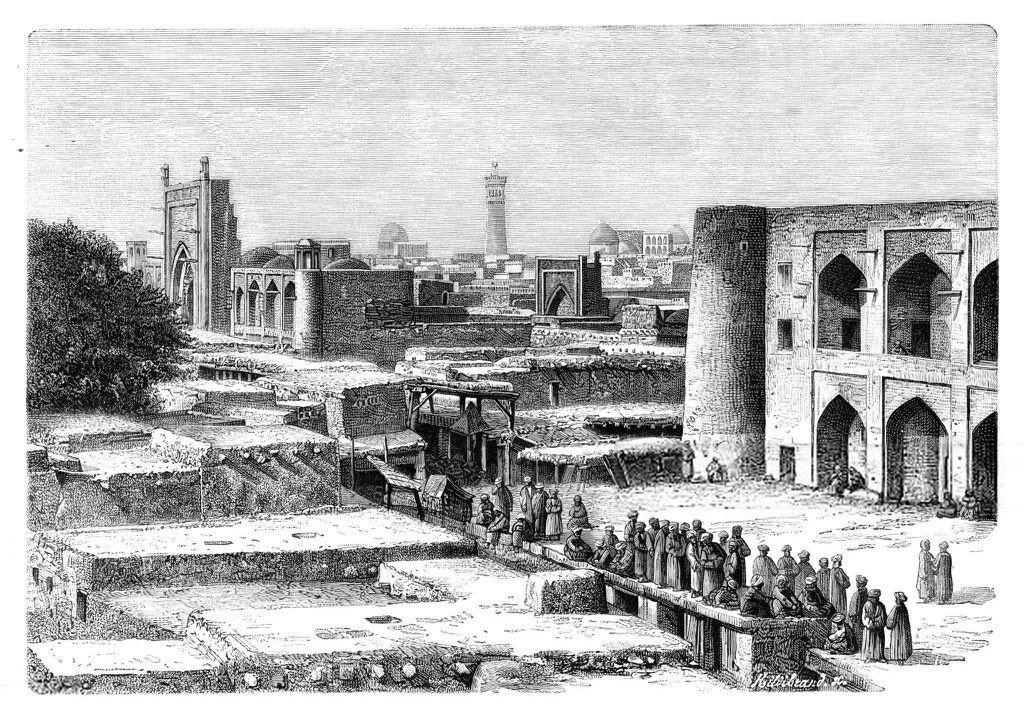

General information
- Status: under the protection of the state
- Type: Madrasah
- Architectural style: Central Asian architecture
- Location: Bukhara Region, Uzbekistan
- Construction started: 1794
- Construction stopped: 1795
- Owner: mulla Ernazar Maqsud ugli

Technical details
- Material: baked bricks
- Size: 40 cells

Mulla Ernazarbek madrasah is located in Bukhara. The madrasah was built by the son of Mullah Ernazar Maqsud in 1794–1795, during the reign of Amir Shahmurad, in the guzar of Sheikh Shona. It is located next to the Kokaldosh madrasah.

== Facilities ==
It has a large inner courtyard. Sadri Zia wrote that there were 40 rooms. It hosted a mosque, a classroom, an inner and outer courtyard, ablution room and a dome. The waqif donated 2 rooms in the north of the madrasah to his descendants. Mirzo Haydar endowed 4 shops in Poyirud, 15 in Namozgoh area, 400 in Kaftovul, and 500 in Karatepa area. Two students lived in each room. It reflectede Central Asian It was built of brick, wood, stone, and ganch.

== History ==
Mullah Ernazar was an ambassador on behalf of the Bukhara Emirate. He visited Russia several times. According to Abdusattor Jumanazarov, the madrasah was built with the funds of Russian ruler-princess Yekaterina II. Ernazar died in Turkey while guiding pilgrims on their way to Hajj. Guldona Taniyeva reported that the madrasah was built with Ernazar Maqsud's son's personal funds. The annual endowment of the madrasah was 35,000 taka. Up to 80 students studied there. The mudarris were paid 1300 coins. This madrasah had a rich library. The madrasa was demolished in the 1950s.

== See also ==
- Modarikhan madrasah
- Gharibiya madrasah
- Joybori Kalon Madrasah
- Govkushon Madrasah
- Daniyol Ataliq madrasah
