= Askarbiy Madrasah =

Madrasah in Bukhara, Uzbekistan

Askarbiy madrasah
- Bukhara Madrasah

General information
- Status: not preserved
- Type: Madrasah
- Location: Uzbekistan, Bukhara
- Owner: Muhammad Askarbiy

Height
- Architectural: Architecture of Central Asia

Technical details
- Material: burnt brick
- Floor count: 2

Askarbiy madrasah is located in Bukhara. The madrasa has not been preserved today. The Askarbiy madrasa was founded by Muhammad Askarbiy under the leadership of Qambari father. Qambari's paternal guzar was later called Askarbiy. In the sources, this guzar is mentioned as Askarbiy guzar. Research scientist Abdusattor Jumanazarov studied a number of foundation documents related to this madrasa and provided information related to the madrasa. According to the foundation document, Muhammad Askarbiy Qambari began to build a mosque and a madrasa under his father's guise. The madrasa was built with 12 rooms of baked bricks, and the mosque was built of wood. The northeastern side of the madrasa had a porch. To the west of the madrasa was the yard of Ismatullah ibn Hasan, to the north was the yard of Olimjan ibn Badaljan and Ustad Nazirjan ibn Badaljan, and to the south and east there was a public road. For this madrasa, Muhammad Askarbiy donated three parts of his property in Armitan region of Kokhkash, Poyirud, Shanba Kotarma region near Dabusiya castle, and one bakery in Bukhara region. The waqif itself was a benefactor to the madrasa. After his death, his descendants performed this task. The first document of this foundation was issued in 1791. This document was approved by Qazi ul-Quzzat Mir Muhammad Fuzayl ibn Mir Muhammad Amin Abdulbari Aziz. In the madrasa, the class was taught by the Banorasposh müderris. There are also many foundation documents about Askarbiy Madrasah, which also contain information about students. Sadri Zia wrote that there were 12 rooms in this madrasa. This madrasa was built in the style of Central Asian architecture.

== See also ==
- Madrasah
- Ulugh Beg Madrasa, Samarkand
- Kalabod Madrasah
- Chor Bakr Madrasah
