= Khoja Gaukushan Ensemble =

Coordinates: 39.7725°N 64.4161°E

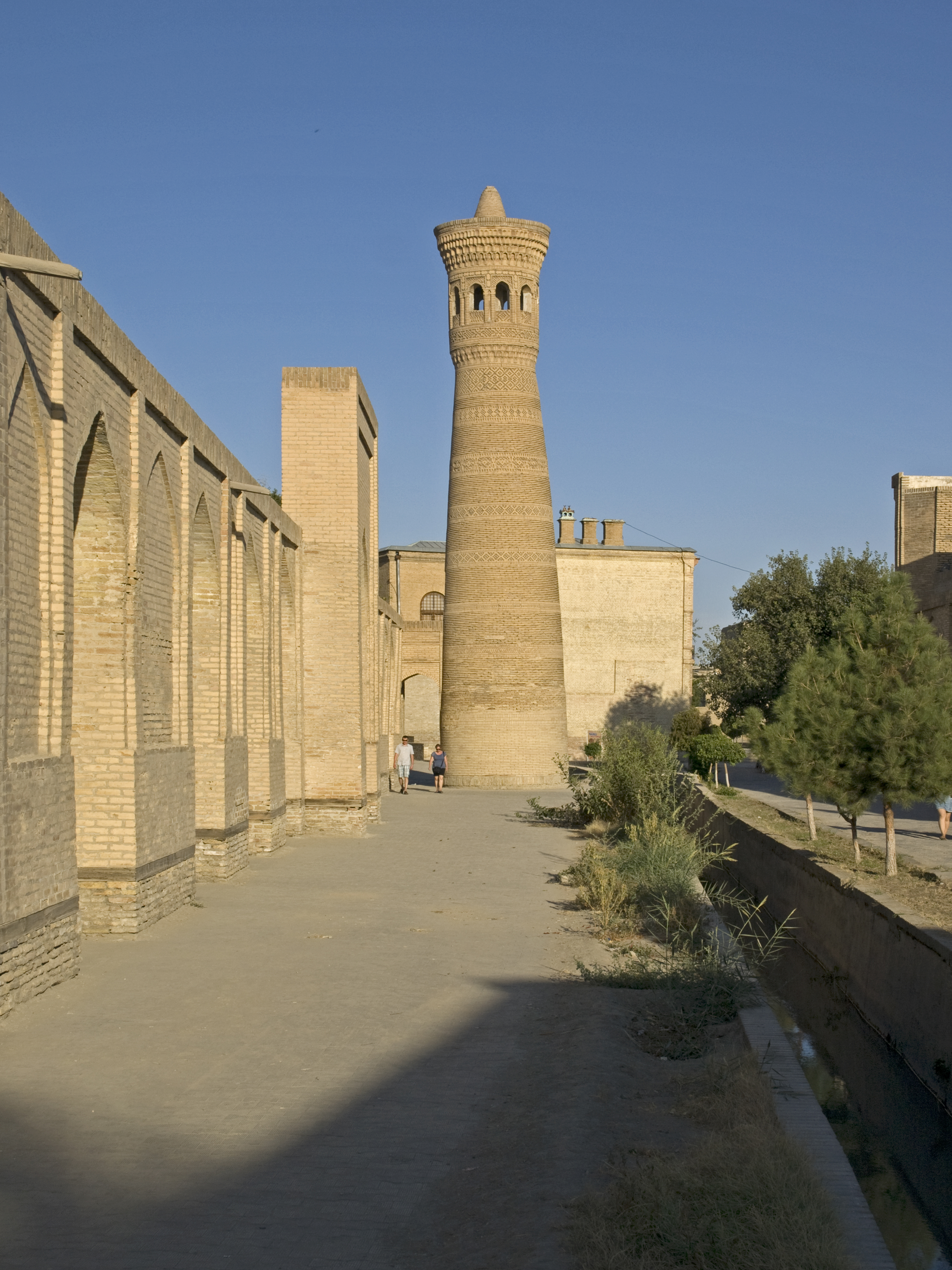
Mosque (left) and minaret of the complex

The Khoja-Gaukushan Ensemble (Uzbek: Govkushon majmuasi / Говкушон мажмуаси) is one of the largest architectural complexes in the center of Bukhara. Along with a number of other buildings in central Bukhara, it is included in the UNESCO World Heritage List.

The name Gaukushan means "killing bulls" as the site was previously home to an animal trading area and even earlier a slaughterhouse.

The complex includes the Govkushon Madrasah and a mosque with the tall and wide Khoja Kalon minaret, equal in width to the Kalyan Minaret, but shorter.

The complex was built in 1570 during the reign of the Uzbek Khan Abdullah II and had a traditional courtyard layout. The trapezoidal shape of the building is explained by its location at a fork in the streets. The buildings of the Khoja Gaukushan Ensemble were made at the expense of the Juybar sheikh Khoja Sa'd, known under the nickname “Khoja Kalon” (“great Khoja”), which was reflected in the name, the mosque and the complex as a whole. In 1598, a Friday mosque called the “Khoja Mosque” was built to the north of the madrasah. “Khoja Kalon” is buried in the family necropolis of the Juybar sheikhs of Chor-Bakr.
