= Joyborcha Madrasah =

Madrasa in Bukhara, Uzbekistan

- Joyborcha Madrasah

General information
- Type: Madrasah
- Location: Uzbekistan, Bukhara
- Construction started: 18the century

Technical details
- Material: brick, wood, stone and ganch

Joyborcha Madrasah is located in Bukhara. The madrasah has not been preserved today. Joyborcha Madrasah was founded by the daughter of Mohammad Elbarskhan in the 18th century, during the reign of Amir Shahmurad, who ruled the Bukhara Emirate, in the family of Jo'ybori. Research scientist Abdusattor Jumanazarov studied a number of foundation documents related to this madrasah and provided information related to the madrasah. According to the foundation document, the madrasah is a high madrasah with twenty rooms with a brick, dome and arches, a high porch, and a stone pool next to it. There were courtyards to the west and north of the madrasah, a courtyard to the east, and a cave of the madrasah owner's house on the other side. For the endowment of this madrasah, all property in the village of Asfijandiq in Harkhanrud and the village of Mudin in the Nasaf region was endowed. The property of the foundation was transferred to the foundation itself. Later, his son Muhammad Qalandarhoja, and then his descendants performed this task. A number of endowment documents related to the Joyborcha Madrasah have been preserved, in which the names of the mudarris Mullah Abduqayum and Mullah Bobojon are mentioned. Their salary was 67 gold. Sadri Zia wrote that there were 23 rooms in this madrasah. Samoviddin Husenov and Iroda Rajabova called this madrasah Ayposhsha bibi madrasa and wrote that it consists of 21 rooms. The Joyborcha Madrasah consisted of 23 rooms. This madrasah was built in the style of Central Asian architecture. The madrasah is built of brick, wood, stone and ganch.

== See also ==
- Chor-Bakr
- Po-i-Kalyan
- Kalabod Madrasah
- Kalyan Minaret
