= Muhammad Nazar Parvonachi Madrasah =

Madrasah in Bukhara, Uzbekistan

- Uzbek: Muhammad Nazar Parvonachi Madrasasi

General information
- Type: Madrasah
- Location: Uzbekistan, Bukhara
- Construction started: 16the century

Technical details
- Material: brick, wood, stone and ganch.
- Size: 13 rooms

Muhammad Nazar Parovanachi Madrasah is located in Bukhara, Uzbekistan. The madrasah has not been preserved today. The Madrasah of Muhammad Nazar the Propeller was built by Khoja Khizr, Muhammad Nazar the Propeller Ibn Ghayib Nazarbi. Research scientist Abdusattor Jumanazarov studied a number of foundation documents related to this madrasah and provided information related to the madrasah. In the endowment document, Hazrat Kalmoqjan Ayim binti Amir ul-Mahrum endows 12 pieces of land in the village of Koshki Safed, Sulakiyan, Arus in 1793 for this madrasah. To the west of Muhammad Nazar parovanachi madrasah there was Havzi lisak land, to the north and east Muhammad Nazarbi yard and street, to the south Guzar mosque and street. Five more foundation documents related to the activities of the madrasah have been preserved. In one of the documents of the foundation, it is mentioned that the madrasa mudarris Alakhoja was a judge of the Samjan district and another mudarris was appointed in his place. At that time, the salary of Mir Rahmatullah and Mullah Alakhoja, the head of the Madrasah of Muhammad Nazar, was 55 gil. A number of waqf documents contain information about mudarris and their salaries. In particular, Mullah Ibrahim's salary was 50 gold, Mullah Abdurahim's salary was 40 gold, and Mullah Abdujalil's salary was 45 gold. This madrasah was demolished during the revolution. Sadri Zia wrote that there were 13 rooms in this madrasah. Muhammad Nazar parvanachi madrasah consisted of 13 rooms. This madrasah was built in the style of Central Asian architecture. The madrasah is built of brick, wood, stone and ganch.

== See also ==
- Chor-Bakr
- Po-i-Kalyan
- Kalabod Madrasah
- Kalyan Minaret
