= Atoullo Khoja Mausoleum =

Historic site in Bukhara, Uzbekistan

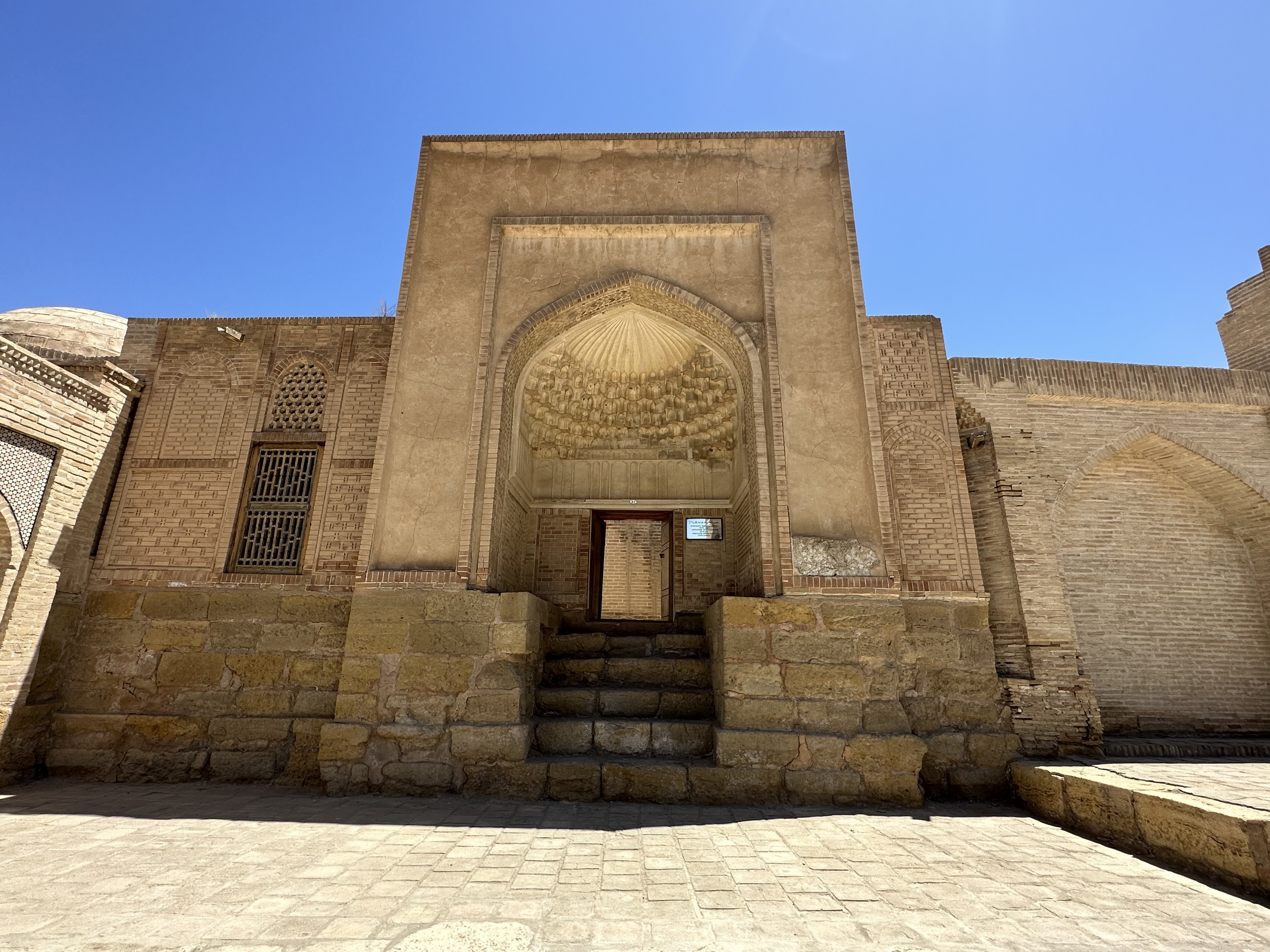
- Interactive map of the Atoullo Khoja Mausoleum area

General information
- Status: Historical site
- Architectural style: Central Asian style
- Location: Bukhara, Uzbekistan
- Coordinates: 39.7747°N 64.3342°E
- Year built: XVII century

Technical details
- Material: Bricks, ganch, wood

Atoullo Khoja mausoleum is an architectural monument in Bukhara. This shrine is located in the Chor Bakr architectural complex and was built in the 17th century. Mausoleum is included in the national list of real estate objects of material and cultural heritage of Uzbekistan.

== Architecture ==
This mausoleum was built in 1679 in Central Asian styles. Khojabori Khojas donated a lot of land for Atoullo Khoja, and the reciters were paid with the funds of this endowment. Bricks, ganch, wood and other materials were used in the construction of mausoleum.

Atoullo Khoja Mausoleum stands out from other mausoleums because of its foundation was made of six layers of stones, and then it was cemented. The outer part of the facade was decorated with patterns, and the inner part was covered with half basins. It is accessed by 6 stairs. The gate is double-paneled, made of wood, and the face of the gate is decorated with flower-like patterns. There is a chillakhana, which was used as a reading room inside the mausoleum. 4 tombstones have been preserved in mausoleum. The tombstones were decorated and have no inscriptions. There are six marble stones between the mausoleum Gate and the tombs. Mausoleum is surrounded by a wall on 4 sides, the walls were decorated with tile patterns. According to historian Ibodat Rajabova, women were buried in this place. The names of Allah and the verse "Ayatul Kursi" are engraved in the side of the first stone. The epitaph was written in Arabic and Persian, and it was recorded who the tomb belongs to. It was written as follows: "This is the pious, pardoned (by Allah) Halima Sultani, daughter of Hazrat Taj ad-Din Hasan, son of Khoja Sa'd, son of Khoja Muhammad Islam, known as Khoja Kalon, known as Hazrat Khoja Joybori. May Allah be pleased with them. He passed from the mortal world to the eternal world on Sunday, the third of Rabbi ul San."

== Literature ==
- Ҳусенов С, Ражабова И. (2001). Чор Бакр. Tошкент: Шарқ нашриёти. p. 144.
- Тўраев Ҳ (2007). Бухоро хонлигининг XVI–XVII асрлар ижтимоий сиёсий ва маънавий-маданий ҳаётида Жўйбор хожаларининг тутган ўрни тарих фанлари доктори илмий даражасини олиш учун ёзилган диссертация. Тошкент. p. 309.
