= Obid Xoja Mausoleum =

Historic site in Bukhara Region, Uzbekistan

- Obid Xoja xazirasi
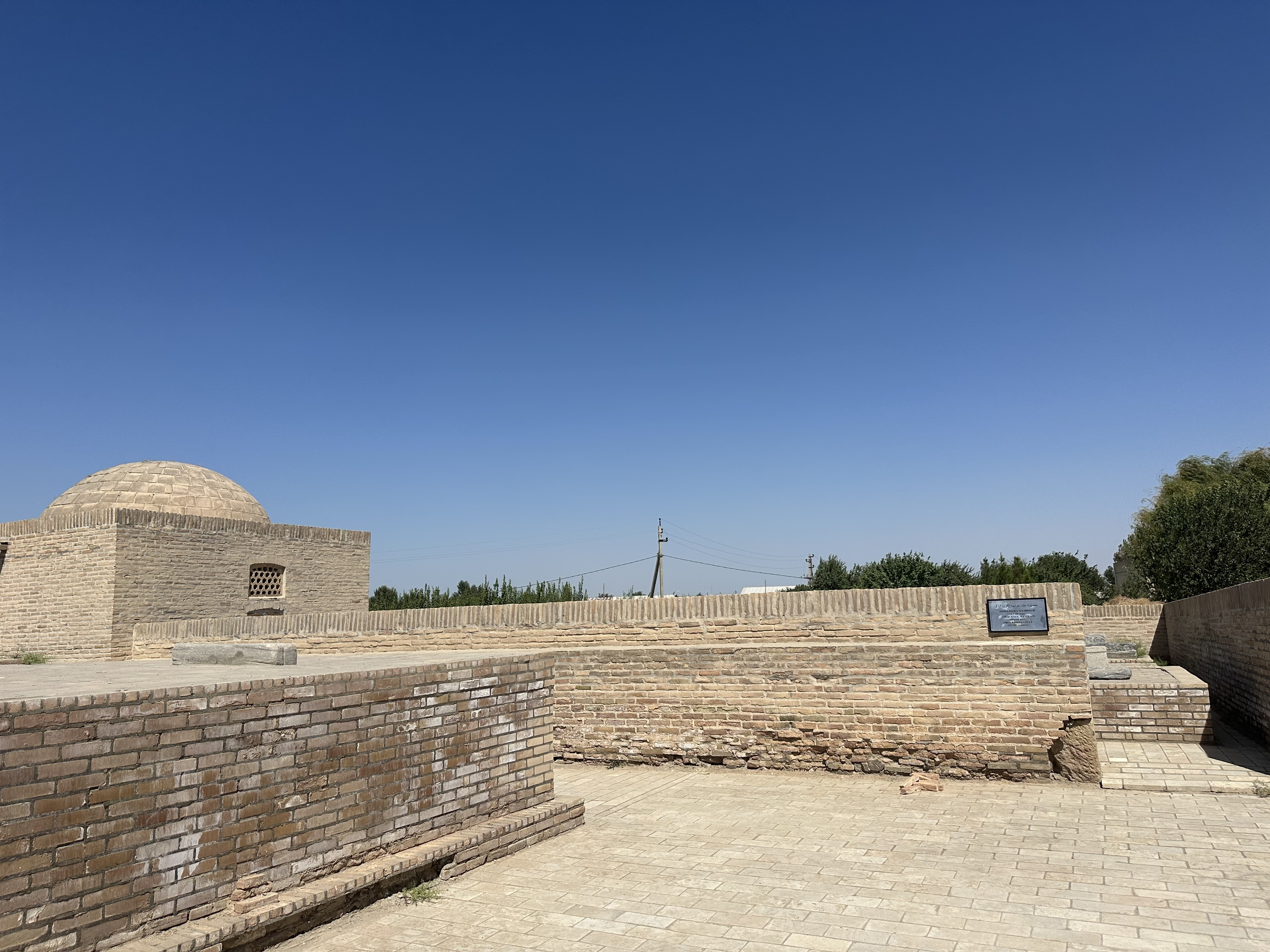
- Obid Xoja Mausoleum

General information
- Location: Chor Bakr memorial complex, Bukhara Region, Uzbekistan
- Year built: 18th century
- Renovated: 1999

The Obid Xoja Mausoleum (Uzbek: Obid Xoja xazirasi) is a historical monument in Bukhara. It is located in the Chor Bakr memorial complex, which was built in the 18th century. The mausoleum is included in the national register of immovable cultural heritage of Uzbekistan.

== Background ==
Obid Xoja Mausoleum is opposite to the Mozori Daroz gate, and can be accessed through the door part. The mausoleum is located inside the Xoja Sa’d tomb. When it was built, the mausoleum was surrounded by walls on all four sides. The walls were repaired and plastered during the restoration process. The mausoleum has a winter house on the north side. The winter house has a dome, and is built with columns and a veranda. The winter house has doors on both sides and on the east side. The mausoleum has a lamp holder. However, the lamp holders are not preserved, only their places are preserved. As a result of the restoration in 1999, restoration works were carried out in the mausoleum. During the restoration, a wall was installed at a depth of 1.5 meters below the ground. The mausoleum has graves and tombstones. According to the historian Ibodat Rajabova, the tombstones in the mausoleum were used for the second or third time. The first tombstone in the Obid Xoja Mausoleum reads:

This is the luminous grave of the pious Faxriya daughter of Hazrati Eshon ibn Muhammad Obid Xoja. She died in the month of Muharram in the year 1170 AH. They moved her from Dorulfanod to Dorulbaqo.

This tombstone was placed in 1755. The second tombstone has the following inscription:

This is the luminous grave of Shamsiyabonu Sultonim. She was famous by the name of Bibi Jo’ybori.

The Jo’ybori family donated many lands for the Obid Xoja Mausoleum.
