= Dahmayi Behishtian =

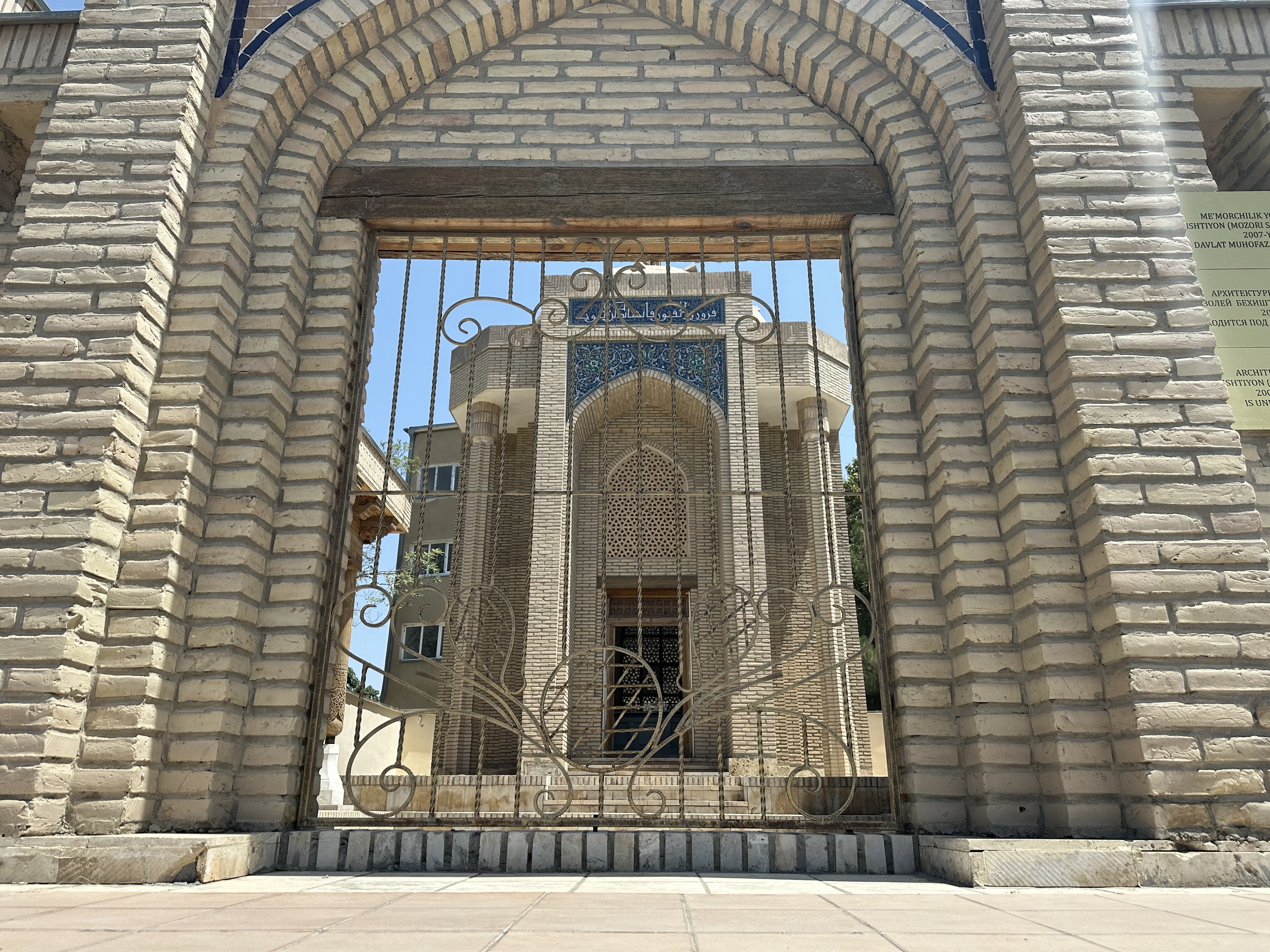

General information
- Location: Bukhara Region, Uzbekistan
- Year built: 2007

Technical details
- Material: baked brick, wood, ganch

Design and construction
- Architect: Mahmud Akhmedov

Dahmayi Behishtian (cemetery) is an architectural monument in Bukhara. In 2007 this monument was built to perpetuate the names of those buried in Mazari Behishtian cemetery. The mausoleum is included in the national list of real estate objects of the material and cultural heritage of Uzbekistan. A cemetery has existed in the place of Dahmayi Behishtian since the Middle Ages. Many famous people were buried in this area in the 8th-20th centuries in tombs and cemeteries such as Pushtayi Behishtian, Pushtayi Tugrobek, Sheikh Rangrez, Yetti Qazi, Darvozai Qavola. In Dahmayi Behishtian, there were graves of people such as Abu Ja'far Muhammad ibn Omar Sha'bi, Abuzaid Abdullah ibn Isa Dabusi, Imam Zadzan, Sheikh Ahmed ibn Omar Shirazi. The grave of encyclopedist Ahmad Donish is also located in this cemetery. During Soviet rule, this cemetery was demolished and replaced by the Bukhara City Oil Factory, the 4th school and the Bukhara Cooperative Technical College. After the independence of Uzbekistan, the Dahmayi Behishtian mausoleum was built in a part of the area where this cemetery is located to perpetuate the memories of people who were buried there. This monument was created under the leadership of the mayor of Bukhara, Kamal Kamolov, based on the project of the chief architect of Bukhara Region, Mahmud Akhmedov. Bukhara masters Olim Abdiyev and Bahriddin Yoldoshev participated in the construction of the mausoleum. In ancient times, there were marble mausoleums on the graves of saints in this area. Next to the Behishtian dahma, there was Quzotus saba, that is, the tomb of the Seven Judges. Famous judges of that time were buried in the cemetery. In 2007, Sadriddin Salim Bukhari's book called "Dahmayi Behishtian" was published in Bukhara.
