= Mirza Ubayd Madrasah =

Madrasa in Bukhara, Uzbekistan

- Mirzo Ubayd Madrasasi

General information
- Type: Madrasah
- Architectural style: Central Asian architecture
- Location: Bukhara Khanate, Uzbekistan
- Construction started: 18 century
- Owner: Mirza Ubayd ibn Mirza Ne'mat

Technical details
- Material: brick
- Size: 15 rooms

Mirza Ubayd madrasah was located in Bukhara, Uzbekistan. The madrasah has not been preserved today. Mirza Ubayd madrasah was built by Mirza Ubayd ibn Mirza Ne'mat in the 18th century under Mirza Ubaidullah, during the Mangit Dynasty that ruled the Bukhara Emirate. Mirza Ubaidullah Guzari was previously called by the names of Babayi al and Char Caravanserai. Research scientist Abdusattor Jumanazarov studied a number of foundation documents related to this madrasah and provided information related to the madrasah. In the original foundation documents, it is written that this madrasah was built by Mirza Ubaid ibn Mirza Ne'mat. This document was formalized in 1780. In the endowment document, Mirza Ubaidullah ibn Mirza Ne'mat endows 40 tanobs of land outside Joybori in Poyrud, in front of Mirjan Keli district. His son Mirza Faiz was appointed as the head of the madrasah. The year 1780 was formalized in this foundation document. Two other endowment documents related to the madrasah document were found. They also contain information about the mudarris who worked in the madrasah. The document mentions the name of a mudarris named Mullah Lutfillah. In the second document, the names of students named Sayyidhoja Khoqandi and Mirzahoja Badakhshi are mentioned. According to Olga Sukhareva, the grave of Mirza Ubaid is located next to this guzar mosque. Sadri Zia Mirza Ubaid wrote that there were 15 rooms in the madrasah. Mirza Ubaid madrasah consisted of 15 rooms. This madrasah was built in the style of Central Asian architecture. The madrasah is built of brick, wood, stone and ganch.

== See also ==
- Domulla Sher Madrasah
