= Zaynab Sultan Khonim Mausoleum =

Burial site in Bukhara, Uzbekistan

- Zaynab sulton xonim xazirasi
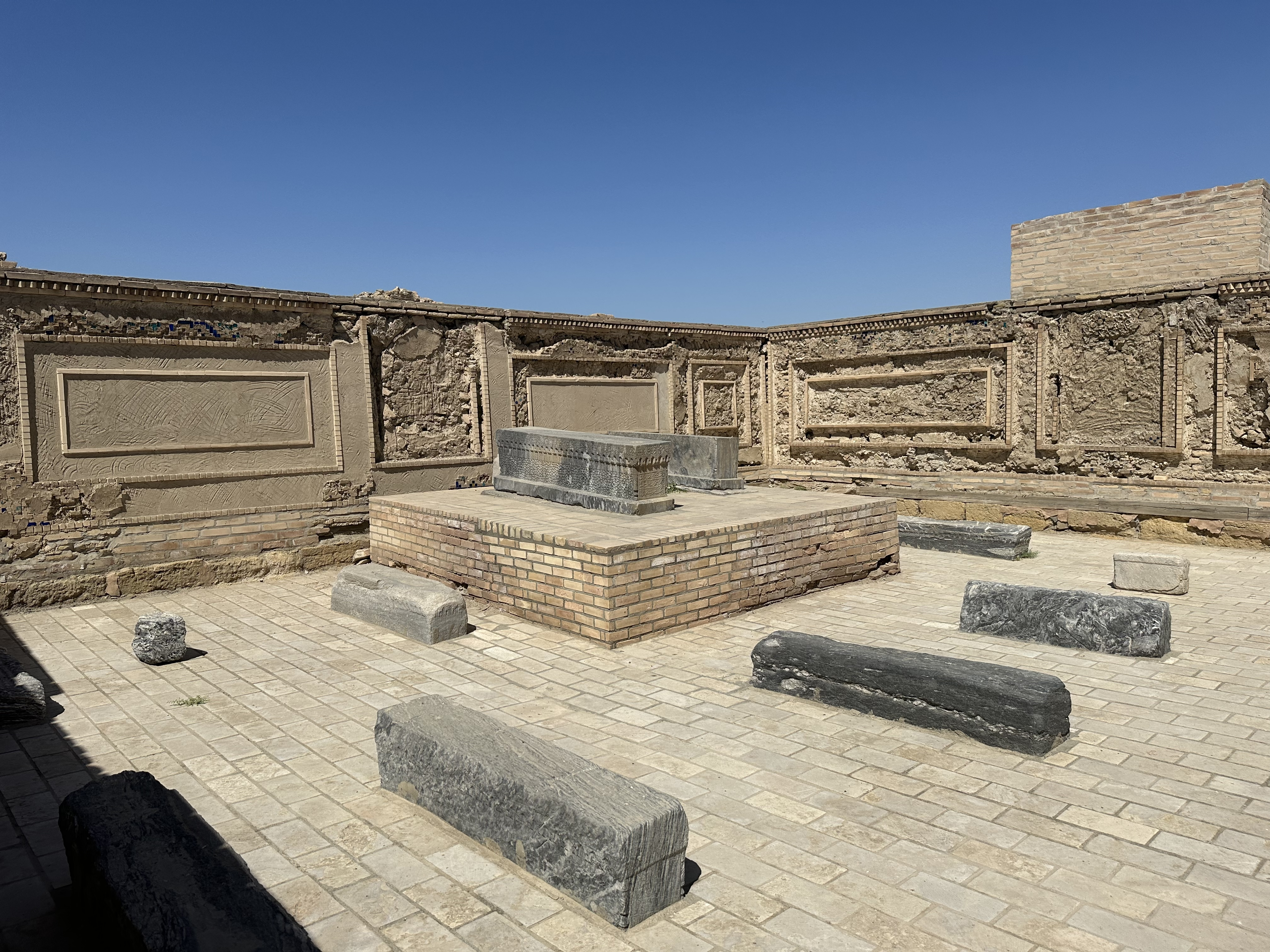
- Zaynab Sultan Khonim Mausoleum

General information
- Architectural style: Historical monument
- Location: Chor Bakr memorial complex, Bukhara Region, Uzbekistan
- Year built: 17th century
- Renovated: 1999

Height
- Height: 3 meters

Technical details
- Material: Yellow sandstone and clay bricks

Zaynab Sultan Khonim Mausoleum (Uzbek: Zaynab sulton xonim xazirasi) is a historical monument in Bukhara.

== Background ==
The mausoleum is located in the Chor Bakr memorial complex, which was built in the 17th century. The mausoleum is included in the national register of immovable cultural heritage of Uzbekistan. The entrance to the Zaynab Sultan Khonim Mausoleum is on the side of the Imomat Mausoleum, and there are three inner courtyards inside. The mausoleum is surrounded by walls on four sides and has a height of 3 meters from the ground level. The lower part of the walls is made of yellow sandstone and the upper part is made of clay bricks. The walls of the mausoleum are decorated with ornamental patterns and Islamic motifs, painted with fragrant colors. The patterns are still preserved to some extent. These patterns are not found in other mausoleums. Reed was placed between the clay bricks and the yellow sandstone. The reed protected the clay from moisture. The reed is so strong that it has not been pierced by any modern method. There are two tombstones on the wooden platform inside the mausoleum. There are also side-by-side graves next to the tombstones, but they do not have marble stones on them. According to historian Ibodat Rajabova, the marble stones may have been on these platforms, or they may have been used for the second time for other graves. The first tombstone is inscribed in Nastaliq script and decorated with carved writings. The stone was used for the second time. It has the following inscription:

“This mausoleum belongs to the holy and pious Hazrat Zaynab Sultan Khonim. She is the daughter of Muhammad Mirzo. May Allah have mercy on them. Date of death: Rajab month, Hijri year 1080”.

This inscription was written in 1680. The second tombstone was also used for the second time, and it has a marsiya (elegy) written on it. The owners of the Joibori estate donated many lands to Zaynab Sultan Khonim and received salaries from the waqf funds. After Uzbekistan gained independence, restoration work was carried out at the mausoleum. In 1999, all the buildings of the mausoleum were restored. The walls of the mausoleum have been preserved until now, and no part of them has been restored.
