= Sadriddin Salim Bukhari =

Uzbek writer (1946–2010)

- Born: Sadriddin Salimov; 16 September 1946; Bukhara, Uzbek SSR, USSR
- Died: 10 March 2010 (aged 63); Bukhara, Uzbekistan
- Education: Bukhara State University
- Occupations: Writer, poet, publicist, historian, translator, scholar
- Employer(s): Bukhara State University, Bukhara Regional Center for Spirituality and Enlightenment (1997–1999), Bukhara publishing house (2001–2010)
- Organization: Uzbekistan Writers' Union
- Known for: Scholarly research on the Naqshbandi order, translating Johann Wolfgang von Goethe's "West–Eastern Divan" to Uzbek
- Awards: Order of Labor Glory (1999), Order of Fidelity to Duty (2005)

Sadriddin Salim Bukhari (Sadriddin Salimov) (16 September 1946, Bukhara, Uzbek SSR, USSR – 10 March 2010, Bukhara, Uzbekistan) was an Uzbek writer, poet, publicist, historian, translator and scholar of Sufism. He also wrote scripts for television films and telefilms. He wrote poems in Uzbek and Tajik languages. He translated Johann Wolfgang von Goethe's "West–Eastern Divan Orchestra" directly from German to Uzbek. His works have been translated into many languages. His scholarly research on the Naqshbandi order has been published in foreign journals.

He worked as a teacher at Bukhara State University, as the director of the Bukhara Regional Center for Spirituality and Enlightenment (1997–1999) and as the chief editor of the Bukhara publishing house (2001–2010) until the end of his life. He was a member of the Uzbekistan Writers’ Union. He was awarded the Order of Labor Glory (1999) and the Order of Fidelity to Duty (2005) by the decrees of the president of Uzbekistan.

After Sadriddin Salim Bukhari's death, the "Durdona" publishing house in Bukhara was named after him, and a book titled "The Noble Poet of the City" containing memoirs and tributes about him was published. Literary and cultural events, memorial and enlightenment evenings dedicated to his memory are still held at Bukhara State University.

== History ==
Sadriddin Salimov was born on September 16, 1946, in a family of intellectuals in Chopboz street of Bukhara city, Uzbek SSR. He studied at the German language faculty of Bukhara Pedagogical Institute (now Bukhara State University) from 1967 to 1972. He then worked at the "Interfaculty Foreign Languages" department of the same institute, teaching German to students for many years. He was the head of the Bukhara Regional Center for Spirituality and Enlightenment from 1997 to 1999. He worked as the chief editor of the Bukhara publishing house from 2001 until the end of his life.

Sadriddin Salim Bukhari died of a severe heart attack in Bukhara on March 10, 2010.

== Works ==
Several poetry books by Sadriddin Salim Bukhari, as well as more than thirty works on historical and educational topics and the history of Sufi saints, have been published. He translated many works. Some of Sadriddin Salim Bukhari's works have been translated into German, Bulgarian, Russian, Ukrainian, English, Turkish and Tajik languages. His treatise "Bahauddin Naqshband or the Seven Pirs" was translated by Samadjon Azimov and published in Germany (2014).

=== Poetry books ===
Sadriddin Salim Bukhari was a member of the Uzbekistan Writers’ Union. His first book, titled "The White Falcon", was published in 1977. After that, his poetry collections such as "My White Bird" (1979), "My Brave Bird" (1979), "The Man of Light" (1983), "The Scarf" (1988), "Bukhara Came to Bukhara" (1999), "The World of Wisdom" (in Tajik language, 2002), "Pearls" (2005), "The World is Wisdom" (after 2010) were published.

=== Works on Sufism and history ===
The results of Sadriddin Salim Bukhari's research as a scholar of Sufism and history are collected in his works such as "The Beloved in the Heart" (1993), "The Great Khorezmians" (1994), "The Three Saints" (2000), "Chor Bakr or the Saints of Joy" (2001), "Hazrat Azizan ar-Rometani" (2002), "Bahauddin Naqshband or the Seven Pirs", "I Have a Master of the World" (2003), "Eshoni Imlo. The Caliph of Khudoydod" (2005), "Hazrat Abu Hafs Kabir", "The Noble Saints of Bukhara", "The Great Gijduvaniys", "Two Hundred and Seventy Seven Pirs" (2006), "Hazrat Bahauddin Naqshband", "The Garden of the Heavenly Ones" (2007), "Khoja Orif ar-Revgariy", "Mavlono Orif Deggaroniy" (2008), "The Saint Shoh Axsaviy Fayzobodiy al-Bukhariy" (2009), "Hazrat Khoja Ismatullah Valiy" (2010), "Hazrat Bayazid Bastami or the Pilgrimage Sites of Navoiy Region", "The Blessed Pilgrimage Sites of Shofirkon", "The Blessed Pilgrimage Sites of Bukhara" (after 2010) in the historical and educational direction.

His book "Two Hundred and Seventy Seven Pirs" contains information about more than 500 scholars. His scholarly research on the Naqshbandi order has been published in the German journal "Der Morgenstern" ("The Morning Star").

=== Translations ===
Sadriddin Salim Bukhari translated the wise works, quatrains of Abdul Khaliq Ghijduwani, Khoja Orif ar-Revgariy, Khoja Ali Rometaniy, Bahauddin Naqshband from Persian, and Johann Wolfgang von Goethe's "West–Eastern Divan" directly from German to Uzbek.

=== Scripts ===
Sadriddin Salim Bukhari was the author of the scripts for the five-part television film "Imam Bukhari" (1998), "Abu Hafs Kabir" (2001), "The Master of the World" (2003) and other telefilms.

== Awards ==
Sadriddin Salim Bukhari was awarded the Order of Labor Glory (1999) and the Order of Fidelity to Duty (2005) by the decrees of the president of Uzbekistan.

== Immortalizing his name ==
After his death, the “Durdona” publishing house in Bukhara was named after Sadriddin Salim Bukhari. On December 15, 2016, a memorial evening titled “The Noble Poet of the City” was held at Bukhara State University on the occasion of the 70th anniversary of Sadriddin Salim Bukhari's birth, in cooperation with the regional administration, the Bukhara regional branch of the Uzbekistan Writers’ Union, the regional department of the Press and Information Agency, Bukhara State University, the editorial boards of the newspapers “Bukhoronoma” and “Bukharskiy Vestnik”. On this occasion, a book titled “The Noble Poet of the City” containing memoirs and tributes about the poet was published.

On November 16, 2020, an enlightenment evening on the topic of “The Noble Poet of the City” was also held at Bukhara State University in memory of Sadriddin Salim Bukhari.

In 2021, a memorial evening titled "Sadriddin also wandered to Bukhara" was held at Bukhara State University on the occasion of the 75th anniversary of Sadriddin Salim Bukhari's birth. During the event, the presentation of his poetry collection "The Ancient Melody" published under the section "The Garden of Poetry" by the initiative of the Uzbekistan Writers’ Union also took place.
