= Jannatmakon Madrasah =

Madrasa in Bukhara, Uzbekistan

- Jannatmakon Madrasasi

General information
- Type: Madrasah
- Architectural style: Central Asian architecture
- Location: Bukhara Khanate, Uzbekistan
- Owner: Bibi Otun

Technical details
- Material: brick, wood, stone and ganch
- Size: 12 rooms

Jannatmakon madrasah is located in Bukhara, Uzbekistan. The madrasah has not been preserved today. Jannatmakon madrasah was built by Bibi Otun in the 18th century during the period of Amir Shahmurad, who ruled the Bukhara Emirate, during the reign of Ja'farkhoja. Research scientist Abdusattor Jumanazarov studied a number of foundation documents related to this madrasah and provided information related to the madrasah. According to some information, this madrasah was built by Amir Shahmurad. Contemporaries honored Amir Shahmurad and called him "Jannatmakon". However, the foundation documents indicate that the madrasah was built by Bibi Otun. According to the foundation documents, the madrasah had eleven rooms, a room, 1 chillakhana, an inner porch, and a sofa outside. The madrasah is built of brick and mortar. To the west of the Jannatmakon madrasah there was the yard of Hazrat Eshan Mullah Niyozquli, to the north there was a street and a sofa, to the east there was a yard of Muhammad Yusufhoja mudarris and a street in between. For this madrasah, Bibi Otun donated 3 tanob khurri holis land in Holvagaron district of Komot district and 2 mills next to it and 3 mills in other areas. Princess Bibi Otun was aware of many sciences and followed the path of her ancestors in the madrasah. He appointed a representative of the Naqshbandi sect as a mudarris to the madrasah. Until the Shura revolution, this madrasah was considered one of the centers of knowledge that propagated the ideas of the Mujadiya-Naqshbandiya sect. The activities of the madrasah were managed by the descendants of Mian Faizullah. Sadri Zia wrote that there were 12 rooms in this madrasah. Jannatmakon madrasah consisted of 11 rooms. This madrasah was built in the style of Central Asian architecture. The madrasah is built of brick, wood, stone and ganch.
