= Chor Bakr Madrasah =

Madrasa in Bukhara, Uzbekistan

Chor Bakr
- Abdullakhan Madrasah
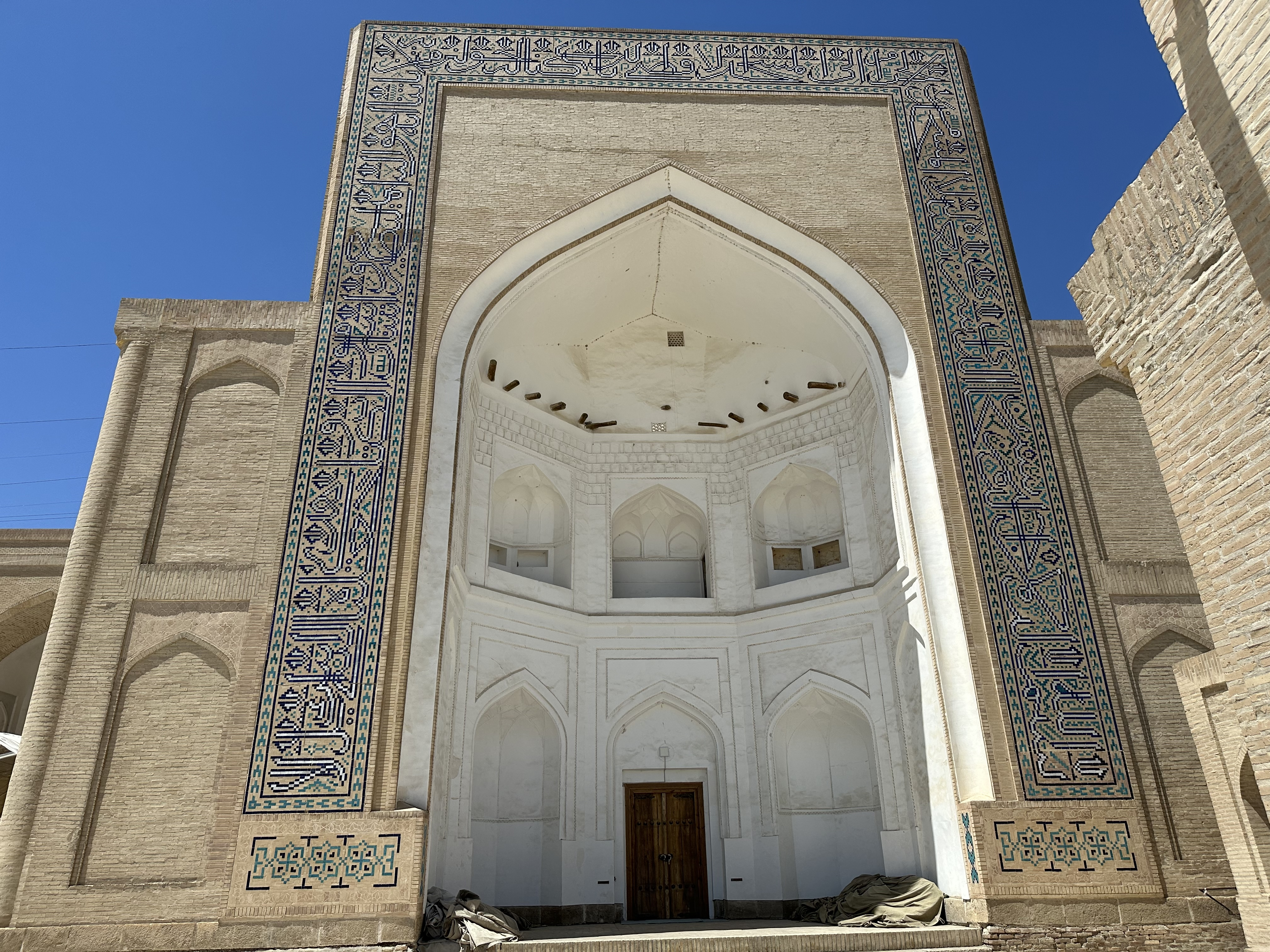
- Interactive map of the Chor Bakr area
- Alternative names: Chor Bakr Madrasah

General information
- Type: Madrasah
- Location: Uzbekistan, Bukhara
- Construction started: 16the century

Technical details
- Material: brick
- Floor count: 2

Chor Bakr Madrasah is an architectural monument in Bukhara.

== Background ==
This madrasa is located in the Chor Bakr architectural complex and was built in the 16th century by Abdullah Khan II, a representative of the Shaybani dynasty. The house is included in the national list of immovable property objects of material and cultural heritage of Uzbekistan. The madrasa was built by Abdullah Khan II in the 16th century, and construction work was carried out in the Chor Bakr complex. The madrasah is multi-roomed and has a prayer area outside. Chor Bakr madrasa was considered one of the highest class madrasas in Bukhara. The roof of the madrasa was 3 stories high and there were cells on all three stories. The madrasa hall is divided into three arches. Historian Hafiz Tanish Bukhari gave information about the madrasa in his work "Abdullah Khan" and wrote that a verse from the sura was quoted on the front of the madrasa. But these inscriptions have not been preserved today. Madrasah was renovated in 1950, 1971, 1999. During the renovation in 1999, masters restored the madrasah towards its original foundation. The madrasah is built of bricks. In the work "Abdullanoma" it is written about Madrasa: "In his madrassa, one of the famous scholars and virtues was a teacher, taught necessary and religious sciences and contributed a lot to endowments. In that place, the students were paid with a good salary, and they were always start reading with peace of mind." The foundation and walls of the madrasa are covered with stones. The archi-duzi method was mainly used in the construction of the cells. In order to create a comfortable environment for the students studying in the madrasa, a stove, a sandal place and shelves for books have been built. Rooms on the second floor are accessed by stairs. The madrasa was built in the style of Central Asia.
