= Bukhara State University =

- Established: 1990
- Rector: Xamidov Obidjon Xafizovich
- Location: Bukhara, Uzbekistan; 39.7622°N 64.4226°E
- Website: buxdu.uz/en/

Bukhara State University, Bukhara State University named after Fayzulla Khodjayev, is a higher educational institution in Bukhara, Uzbekistan that trains scientific and pedagogical personnel.

== History ==
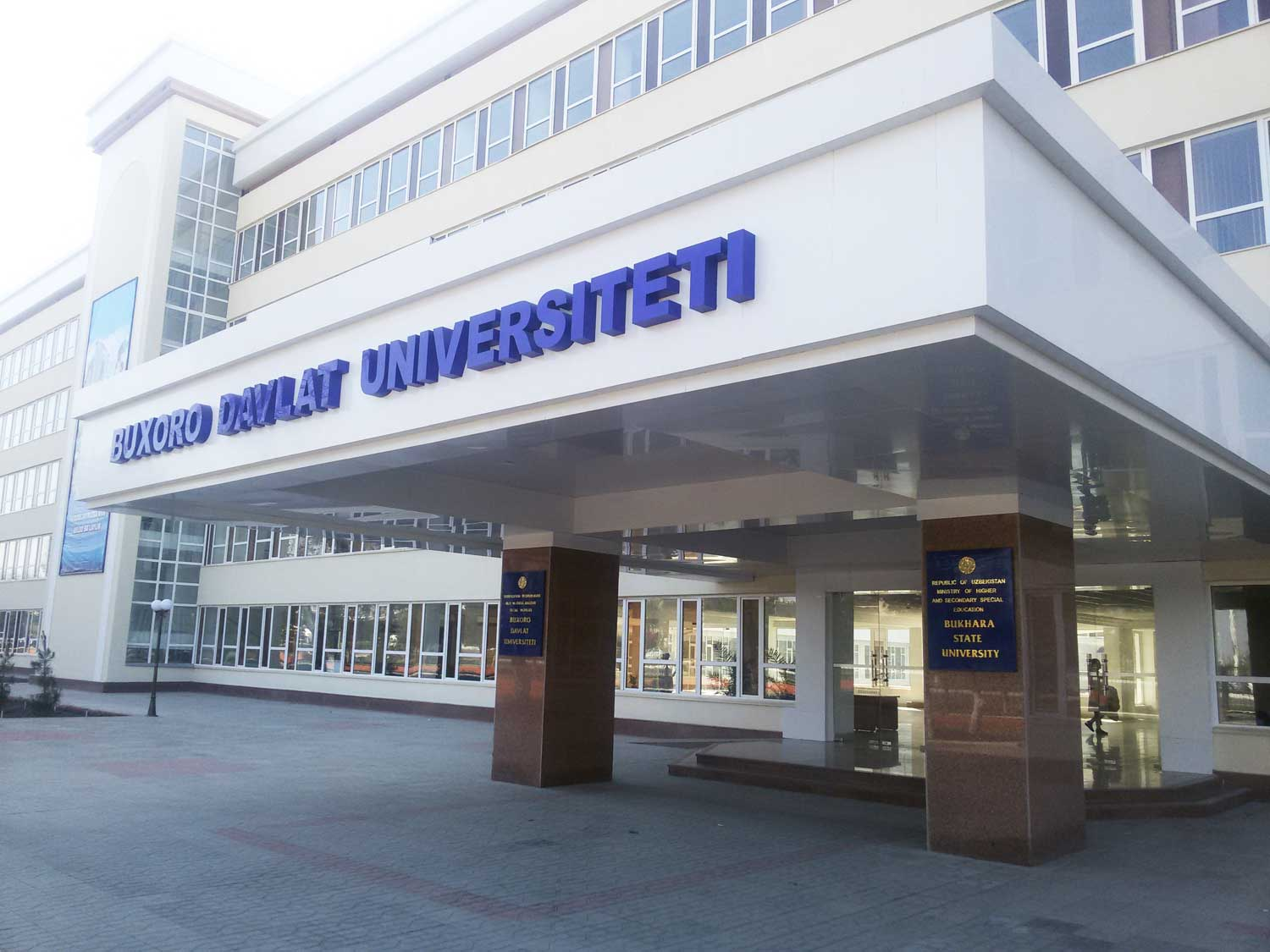
Bukhara State University

It was founded on the basis of the Decree of the President of the Republic of Uzbekistan on March 15, 1992 based on the Bukhara Pedagogical Institute which was founded in 1930.

There are 9 faculties (physics, economics, chemistry, agriculture, art graphics and folk applied art, history, foreign languages, pedagogy and physical culture, Uzbek philology), a social learning center, 50 specialized departments, a regional language center, a specialized academic lyceum, a gymnasium, preparation courses, a library (with rare manuscripts and lithographs), a botanical garden, a planetarium, computing centers, test centers, university history Archaeological sites, museums, trainings, sports training, sports complexes, educational and educational work clubs (2001). There are 23 specializations in the department. There are postgraduate, master's and doctorates. In the 2000/2001 academic year, more than 5,000 students were trained, 341 teachers, including 1 academician of the Academy of Sciences of Uzbekistan, 28 doctors and professors, 272 candidates of sciences and associate professors. There are scientific researches in different areas such as Russia, Italy, Ireland, France, MAP, Poland, Germany and the United States. Since its inception, the University has trained more than 25,000 professionals (2001).Future Doctor Education Services is Portal For Admission in Bukhara State University for Foreigner Students.

== Rectors of Bukhara State University ==
1. Vahabov Karimjon. 1930-1931
2. Usmonov G’anijon. 1931-1934
3. Valiyev X.X. 1934-1935
4. Rajabov D. 1935-1936
5. Tereshxanov G.X. 1937-1938
6. Rustamov Agzam. 1938-1940
7. Sbizova Anna Ivanovna. 1940
8. Davlat - Yusupov Mustafo Xasanovich. 1940-1943
9. Hamidov (Homidiy) Sharif Hamidovich. 1944-1948
10. Jo’rayev Turob Jo’rayevich. 1948-1950
11. Maqsudov Sh.T. 1951-1955
12. Yakubov R. 1955-1957
13. Rahmatov Muxtor Ne’matovich. 1957-1960
14. Namozov Juma Namozovich. 1960-1977
15. Jabborov Narimon Ibragimovich. 1977-1979
16. Mo’minov Vafo Arabovich. 1979-1986
17. Qosimov Farhod Habibovich. 1986-1992
18. Muqimov Komil Muqimovich. 1992-2005
19. Yoriyev Oltin Muzaffarovich. 2005-2009
20. Tadjixodjayev Zokirxo’ja. 2010-2014
21. Tulaganov Abdukabil Abdunabiyevich. 2014-2018
22. Xamidov Obidjon Xafizovich 2018--present
