= Ja'farkhoja Naqib Madrasah =

Madrasa in Bukhara, Uzbekistan

Ja'farkhoja naqib madrasah
- Jafarxo'ja naqib Madrasasi

General information
- Type: Madrasah
- Architectural style: Central Asian architecture
- Location: Bukhara Khanate, Uzbekistan
- Owner: Muhammad Ja'farkhoja naqib

Technical details
- Material: brick, wood, stone and ganch
- Size: 19 rooms

Ja'farkhoja naqib madrasah is located in Bukhara, Uzbekistan. The madrasah has not been preserved today. Ja'farkhoja naqib madrasah was built in the 18th century in Ja'farkhoja's guzar, during the reign of Ubaydullah Khan, the Ashtarkhanid ruler who ruled the Bukhara Khanate, Muhammad Ja'farkhoja naqib. According to sources, 40 teachers taught students in this madrasah. Research scientist Abdusattor Jumanazarov studied a number of foundation documents related to this madrasah and provided information related to the madrasah. Excerpts of foundation documents related to Ja'farkhoja naqib madrasah have been preserved. These foundation documents were copied during the reign of Amir Shahmurad, the emir of Bukhara. It is written that the madrasah was built of brick, stone and wood. It is written that the madrasah had 19 wooden rooms, an outer court and one dome. To the west of Ja'farkhoja naqib madrasah, there was land and property of the foundation, to the east was Kahirkhoja's house, and to the north was a farm, and to the south was a street. Vafiq has endowed many areas for this madrasah, and in Chorjoi region, he will endow several areas in Koyi Navak Dargan, Sufrador, Bachkas, Boyazd Dargan, Arna in Karakol, Parokanda in Shafirkom, Karjan district. This madrasah was supported by the foundation itself. After that, the imam of the sangin khanaqah in Cairo Khoja, in front of the madrasah, became the Mutawwali. According to Abdurauf Fitrat, the annual endowment of this madra is 250,000 tanga. According to Olga Sukhareva, this madrasah consisted of 50 rooms. Muhammad Ja'farkhoja Naqib lived in the era of Ashtarkhani rulers Subhanquli Khan and Ubaydullah Khan who ruled Bukhara. He was promoted to the rank of Naqib during Ubaidullah Khan's time. Sadri Zia wrote that there were 18 rooms in this madrasah. Ja'farkhoja naqib madrasah consisted of 19 rooms. This madrasah was built in the style of Central Asian architecture. The madrasah is built of brick, wood, stone and ganch.
