= Govkushon Madrasah =

Madrasa in Bukhara, Uzbekistan

Govkushon madrasah
- Govkushon madrasasi
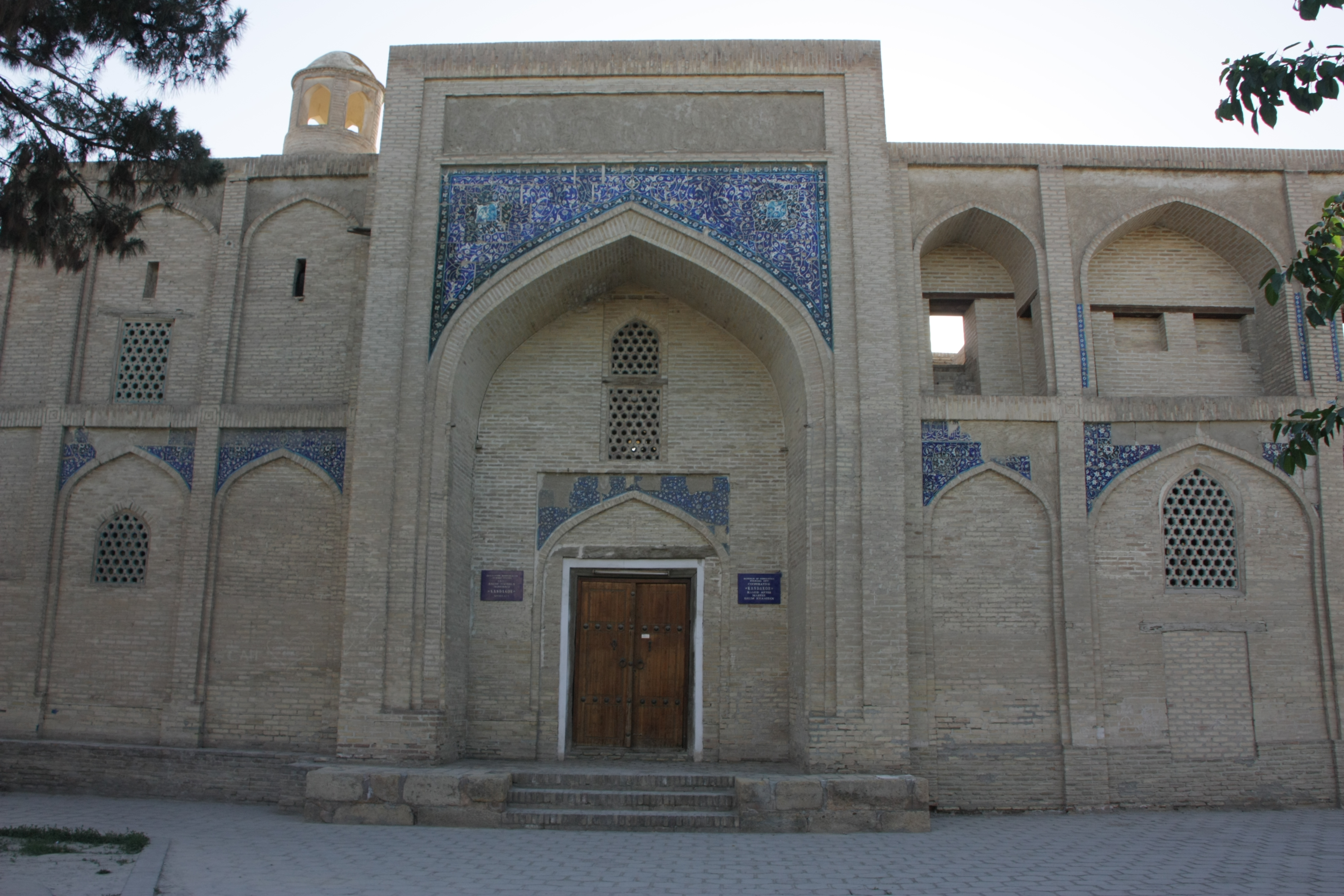
- Interactive map of the Govkushon madrasah area

General information
- Status: under the protection of the state
- Type: Madrasah
- Architectural style: Central Asian architecture
- Location: Bukhara Region, Uzbekistan
- Coordinates: 39.7722°N 64.4160°E
- Construction started: 1562
- Construction stopped: 1565
- Owner: Kho'ja Sa'd

Technical details
- Material: baked bricks

Govkushon madrasah is an architectural monument (XVI century) in Bukhara, Uzbekistan. Madrasah built by Khojabor Khojas. It is part of Khoja Gaukushan Ensemble. It is an object of cultural heritage of Uzbekistan. The madrasah building of Khoja-Govkushon architectural ensemble was built in the historical center of Bukhara (Uzbekistan) in 1562-1565 during Shaybani ruler Abdulla Khan II at the expense of Khoja Saad, the sheikh of Dzhoybor. Khoja Sa'd is known by the nickname "Khoja Kalon", which is reflected in this name complex.

The name Govkushan ("killing bulls") is related to the fact that there was a slaughterhouse (poultry) here until the 16th century. A little later, after the construction of the madrasah, Bukhara's second Juma Mosque, known as the Khoja Mosque, was built around it, with a pool and a low minaret, imitating the Kalyan Minaret. Later, caravanserais were built nearby.

Due to the uneven shape of the construction site, the monument has an asymmetrical shape, and its structure is different from traditional madrasas. The side wings of the two-story main look differ in size and shape.

On the right side is a rectangular hall used as a mosque and a classroom. The left wing of the building consists of multi-domed roofs and closed houses. The courtyard is surrounded by one-story rooms.

A small tower (19.5 m) is located on the left side of the building. On the opposite side of the main building is a beautiful porch. It was renovated several times during the Soviet era. The monument is under state protection.

The layout of the madrasah is traditional, it consists of classrooms and halls with a mosque, and a courtyard with one-story rooms.

It was included in the list of UNESCO World Heritage Sites in 1993 as part of the "Historical Center of Bukhara". In 1997, on the occasion of the 2500th anniversary of the city of Bukhara, the Govkushon madrasah was renovated among all the monuments in Bukhara. It is also a tourist service and exhibition facility with workshops.
