= Joybori Kalon Madrasah =

Madrasa in Bukhara, Uzbekistan

- Jo'ybori Kalon madrasasi
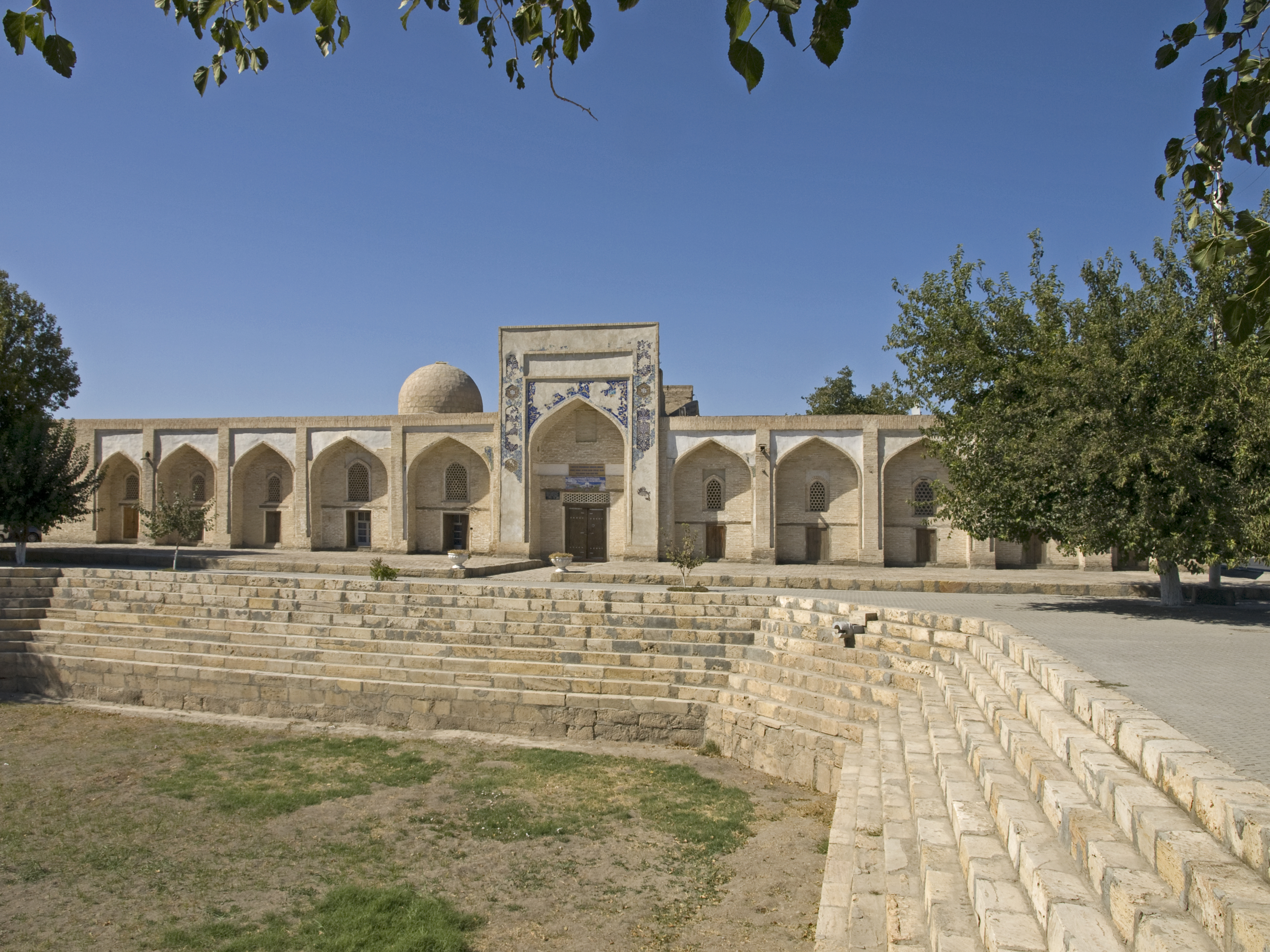
- Interactive map of the Joybori Kalon Madrasah area

General information
- Status: under the protection of the state
- Type: Madrasah
- Architectural style: Central Asian architecture
- Location: Havzi nav MFY, Havzi nav street, 92-A, Bukhara Region, Uzbekistan
- Coordinates: 39.7668°N 64.4035°E
- Owner: State property. Bukhara Region Cultural Heritage Department on the basis of operational management rights
- Landlord: Podshoh oyim

Technical details
- Material: baked bricks
- Size: 29 (21)

Website
- https://juyborikalon.uz/

Joybori Kalon Madrasah (Madrasah of Joybor, Khoja Joybori Kalon madrasah, Ayposhsha Ayim madrasah) is located in Bukhara, Uzbekistan. During the reign of the Uzbek ruler Abdulaziz Khan (1645-1681), it was built in Havzi nav guzar of Joybor district in the capital of the Khanate under the donation of his mother Podshah. It was one of the most prestigious and prestigious madrasahs in Bukhara.

Historical sources provide a lot of information about the Joybori Kalon madrasah. The one-story madrasahhas 29 rooms and a large library.

== waqf documents ==
Several copies of the foundation documents of the Joybori Kalon madrasah ave been preserved. One of them is original, and the other two are copies copied during the reign of Amir Shahmurad. There is almost no difference between them. In the original waqfnama drawn up in January–February 1671, Podshah Ayim bint Abdurahimhoja's structure is made in the shape of an egg and there is a seal reminiscent of the seal of the Khans.

The foundation said to the foundation: "If a single brick of the building remains broken, none of the trustees shall be given a single chakayam!" - as a strict condition in the order. In the document, it was necessary to buy 10 felts every two years and a new mat every year for the mosque within the mutawalli educational dargah.

The annual endowment of the madrasah was 130,000 tanga. The provision of madrasah mudarris and students is separated from the rest of the waqf funds specified in the waqfnama for the repair of the madrasah, the amount of its share is clearly defined in the waqf document. According to the document, the total share of mudarris was 500 gil and the share for students was 20 gil.

There were 13-16 mudarris who taught in the Joybori Kalon Madrasa, and they received 35-50/55 gold salaries depending on the total number and category of mudarris in the madrasah. Since the teachers belonged to different categories, their salaries also differed from each other.

== History ==
Historical sources contain a lot of information about the Joybori Kalon Madrasah. Muhammad Sharif Makhdum informed that it was built by Princess Ayposhsha. It was one of the most prestigious and prestigious madrasas in Bukhara. His library has more than 8,000 books.

During the time of the Uzbek ruler Abdulaziz Khan (1645-1681), the Joybori Kalon madrasah was founded in Havzi nav guzar of the Joybor district in the capital of the khanate under the donation of his mother Podshah and was named "Joybor" as a reference to the queen's lineage.

Some researchers unjustifiably doubted that this madrasah was built by Potshah Ayyim. For example, according to L. Asrorova, the Joybori Kalon madrasah was built during the time of the Uzbek ruler Subhankulikhan (1680-1702) by the decree of the governor of Bukhara Abdulaziz Khan, and it is said that Abdulaziz Khan's mother, Ayposhsha Bibi, took part in the construction of the madrasah. Even on the official site of the Joybori Kalon madrasah, it is written that the educational institution was established during the reign of Subhankulikhan. However, in 1670–1671, when the madrasah was built, Subhankuli Khan was not yet the ruler.

According to one of the historical documents, a room from theJoybori Kalon Madrasah was rented for 18 gold.

During the Soviet era, the activity of teaching students in the madrasah was terminated, and it was turned into a barn, later a bakery, and then a place for receiving glassware. As a result, the madrasah became abandoned.

The activity of the madrasah was resumed on September 1, 1992. Now it has been functioning as the Islamic secondary school for women and girls, Joybori Kalon. In it, students learn religious and secular subjects in the course of the lesson.

== Architecture ==
Joybori followed the ancient tradition in the construction of the Kalon madrasah.The miyansarai is entered through a gate inside the luxurious peshtak. To the left of the Mion Palace is a mosque, and to the right is a series of rooms and pillapoyas that lead to the roof. The madrasah has one floor and 21 rooms. The possibilities are wide. The cells are connected to each other through roof domes. It is connected to the street and the stage by light-filled domes. There are nodal grids that allow light to enter the street and the stage. The wall of the inner courtyard of the madrasah is unadorned. The surface of the rooms and the doors are decorated with obi brick sections. In the middle of the yard there is an obrav - a path through which waste water falls. There are three outer rooms in the left wing wall of Peshtok. The walls facing the street are decorated with arches. There is a bouquet on both sides of the peshtak, there is no flower in the bouquet. The decoration of the madrasah is gilded with tiles in the color of gulnari (the art of decorating with the color of spring flowers). There were notes in the peshtak book. Today, not a single word remains from the writings. There are examples of tiles on the surface of the peshtak.

== Literature ==
- Asrorova, L. Q. (2017). Buxoro madrasalari tarixidan. Toshkent: Hilol-Nashr. p. 224. ISBN 978-9943-4818-6-2.
- Bobojonova, F. (2014). Buxoro amirligida taʼlim tizimi (XIX asr oxiri — XX asrning boshlarida). Toshkent: Adib. p. 128.
- Jumanazar, A. (2017). Buxoro taʼlim tizimi tarixi. Toshkent: Akademnashr. p. 592. ISBN 978-9943-4728-2-2.
