= Domulla Sher Madrasah =

Madrasa in Bukhara, Uzbekistan

- Domulla Sher Madrasasi
- Interactive map of the Domulla Sher Madrasah area

General information
- Type: Madrasah
- Architectural style: Central Asian architecture
- Location: Bukhara Khanate, Uzbekistan
- Owner: Domulla Shermuhammad

Technical details
- Material: brick, wood, stone and ganch
- Size: 19 rooms

Domulla Sher Madrasah is located in Bukhara. The Madrasah has not been preserved today. Domulla Sher Madrasah was built by Domulla Shermuhammad in the 19th century under Khoja Zomuchi, during the reign of Amir Haydar, who ruled the Bukhara Emirate. Research scientist Abdusattor Jumanazarov, studied a number of foundation documents related to this Madrasah and provided information related to the Madrasah. According to the foundation documents, the Madrasah consisted of 15 upper and lower rooms, a classroom, a mosque, a toilet and a mustahabkhana. There was a Kokaldosh Madrasah and a street in the west of the Madrasah, a street and a courtyard in the north and east, and a courtyard of Muhammad Salim in the south and a road leading to the Kokaldosh Madrasah. This Madrasah was supported by the foundation itself. At the end of the 19th century, Mullah Nabirahoja taught in the Madrasah. During the Soviet period, in 1922, the Domulla Sher Madrasah was turned into a prison. Domulla Shermuhammad was one of the prominent scholars of his time. He reached the level of recitation and taught at the Kokaldosh madrasa. He is originally from Kogan and lived in Bukhara for many years. He received his knowledge from Shaykhul-Islam Atoullah Khoja ibn Hadikhoja. Domulla Shermuhammad became blind at the end of his life. He died in 1824 at the age of 86 Sadri Zia wrote that there were 49 rooms in this Madrasah. The research scientist Abdusattor Jumanazarov, based on the documents of the foundation, indicated that the Madrasah consists of 19 rooms. Domulla Sher Madrasah consisted of 19 rooms. This Madrasah was built in the style of Central Asian architecture. The Madrasah is built of brick, wood, stone and ganch.
