= Kalabod Madrasah =

Madrasa in Bukhara, Uzbekistan

Kalabad
- Bukhara Madrasah
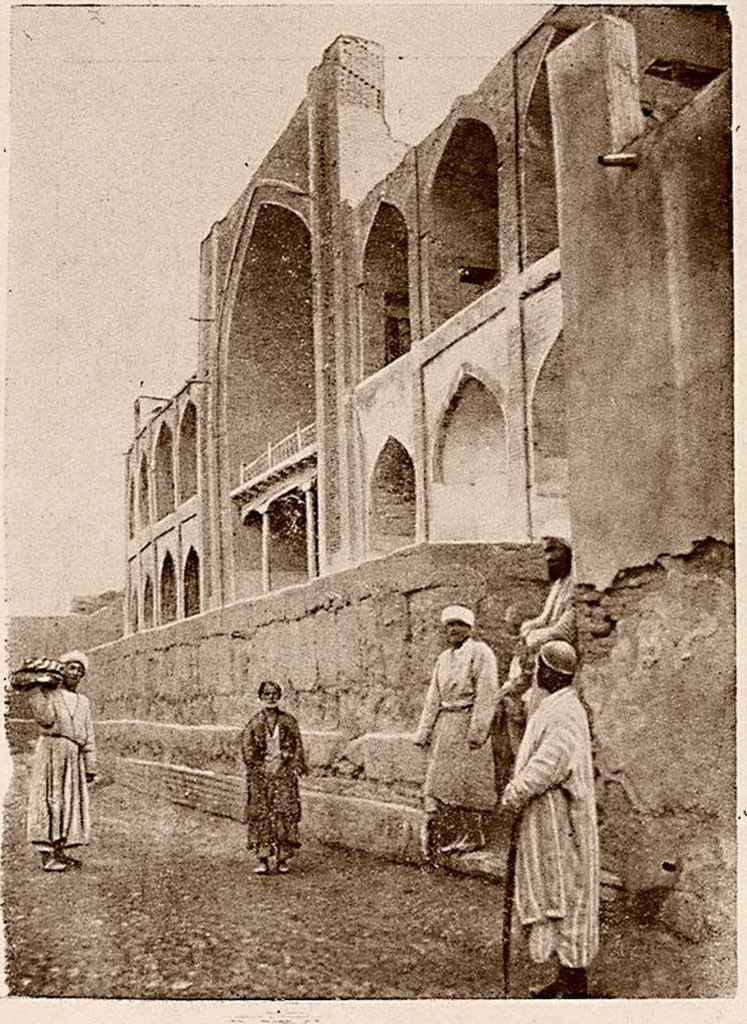
- Former names: Xon Madrasah Arslonxon Madrasah Abdurahimxoja Madrasah
- Alternative names: Kalobod Madrasah Gulobod Madrasah

General information
- Status: not preserved
- Type: Madrasah
- Location: Uzbekistan, Bukhara
- Construction started: 16the century
- Construction stopped: 1609
- Closed: 1953

Technical details
- Floor count: 2

Kalabad Madrasah is the original name of the Bukhara Madrasah, which operated in the 9th–20th century and has not been preserved. In historical sources, it is called Arslon Khan Madrasah, Khan Madrasah, and Abdurahimhoja Madrasah. At the current time, it is called "Gulabad Madrasa" or "Kalabad Madrasa". Many famous historical people like Imom al-Bukhari have studied there.

The Madrasah was built in 800–810, after the arrival of Islam in Bukhara, and it was rebuilt three times in the following periods: the first time in 1124, by Amir Kutvol, one of the scholars of Arslan Khan Muhammad (1102–1130); the second time during the reign of the Mongols, by Kayhotun's mother Suyurtuk tegina begum; the third time in 1609, during the reign of Uzbek Vali Muhammad (1605–1611), by Joyboriy Abdurahimkhoja.

Kalabad Madrasah is one of the oldest educational institutions in the world. When the Kalabad madrasa was established, there was no educational institution in Europe. After 500 years, Abdurahimkhoja rebuilt the Kalabad Madrasah for the third time, at that time there was no higher educational institution in the world.

The building of the Kalabad Madrasah rebuilt by Abdurahimkhoja was one of the largest Madrasahs in Bukhara in terms of size and scope. It was built in the traditional style of Turanian Madrasahs. It consisted of a mosque, a classroom, a library, toilets, and 79 or 100 rooms. The peculiarity of Madrasah architecture is that there are no flower bouquets installed on the corners of the walls on both sides of the main facade; there was a special porch under the roof arches, equal to the second floor. Later, this style was used in Khorezm madrasahs; yards without corner sections, and edged estimates.

The Madrasah operated until the 1920 Bukhara revolution. Its building was used as a prison in the 1930s, and later as a residence belonging to the municipal utility. It was destroyed in 1953. The bricks were used in the construction of Bukhara School No. 5, which was first named after K.Y. Voroshilov, and later after A.S. Makarenko. Currently, the courtyards are standing in place of the madrasa building.

== Names ==
The name of the Kalabad Madrasah appears in the forms of Kalobot, Kalabon, and Kalonabad madrasa in several manuscripts copied from it. According to Sadri Zia, the original name of the madrasa is Kalabad. Between the 12th and 17th centuries, it was also known as the Madrasah of Arslan Khan. It is also known as Khan Madrasa.

Joyboriy Abdurahimhoja will rebuild this higher educational institution and restore the previous foundation properties. For this reason, in some sources, it is also written as Abdurahimhoja Madrasah.

Currently, the names Kalabad madrasa and sometimes Gulabad Madrasah is used in most cases as alternative names for the madrasa. According to S. S. Bukhari, the word Kalabad is written and read in this way because there is no letter "g" in the Arabic language and script, and it is actually Gulabad. According to the candidate of philosophy B. B. Namozov, there is almost no difference between the names Kalabad and Gulabad, from the point of view of the Arabic language, the term Kalabad, and from the etymological point of view, it is called Gulabad in Persian.

== History ==
The Kalabad Madrasa was built outside the ancient fortress of Bukhara, inside the Kalabad Gate, in the neighborhood of the same name.

Scholars of Bukhara were interested in the first Madrasahs, and there were disputes between them. Sadri Zia writes on this issue:

Kalabad is one of the oldest Madrasahs of Bukhara. Historians still disagree: "Is Kalabad ancient or Western?" Kalabad Madrasa was rebuilt three times. It was first carried out by Kayhotun's mother Shortoqsabegim. He was a Christian. He built this madrasa to attract the attention of Muslims. He appointed the scholars and sheiks as his guardians and administrators…

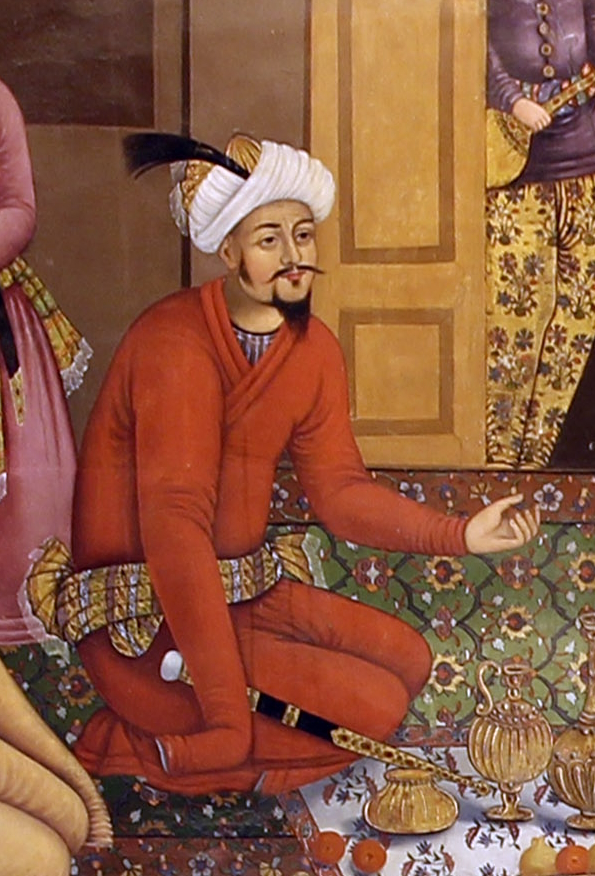
Ruler of uzbeks Vali Muhammad Khan's picture

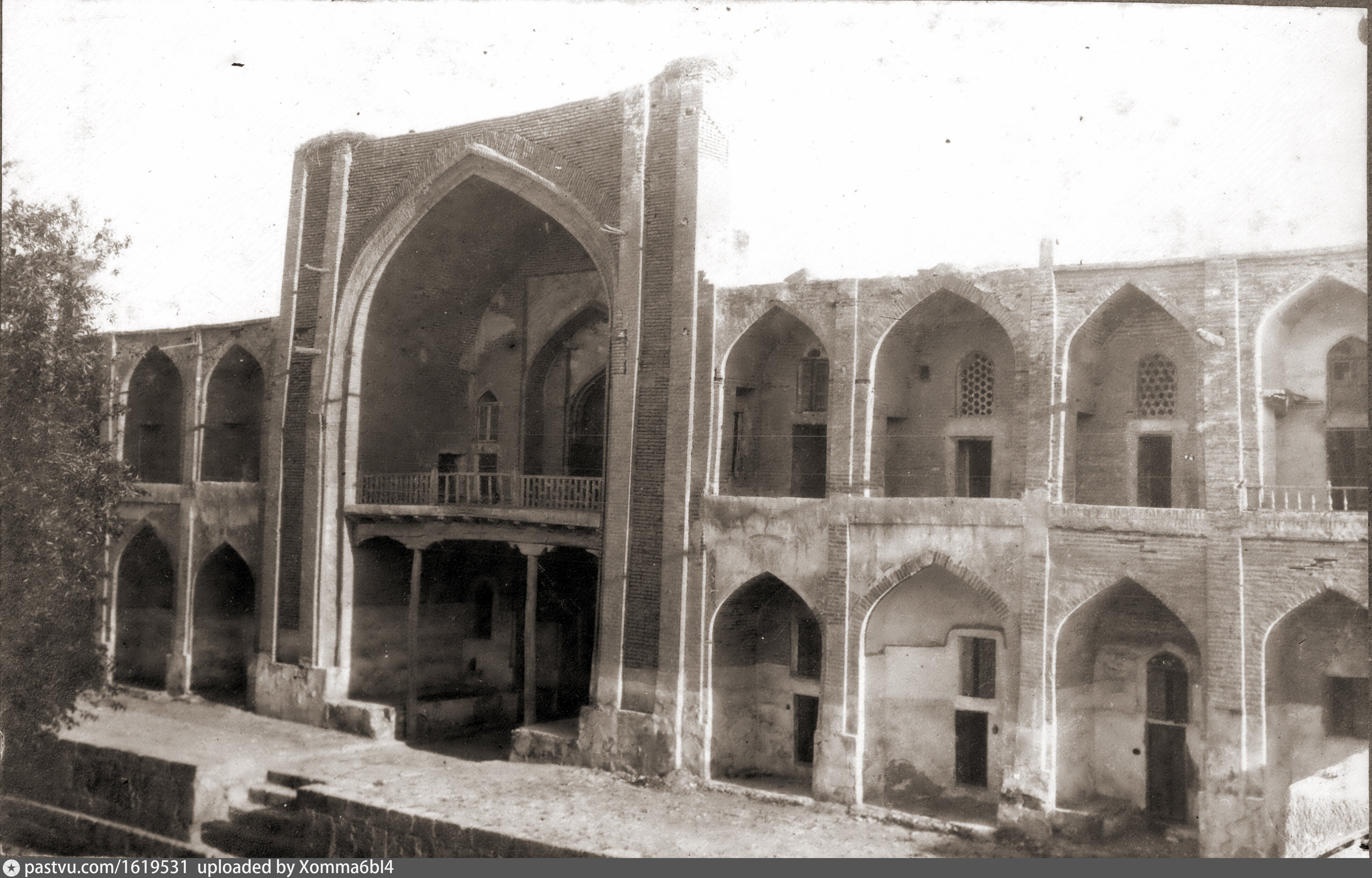
Kalabod Madrasah.1924—1926.

Sadri Zia said that this Madrasah was rebuilt three times. Even though there are such disputes among scholars, the history of Bukhara madrasas is almost not specifically covered in the sources. According to O. A. Sukhareva, residents of Bukhara consider Kalabad madrasa to be the oldest madrasa in the city. A. K. Jumanazar, in his monograph on the history of Bukhara education system and madrasahs, took into account the dispute between Bukhara scholars described by Sadri Zia Makhdum and includes Kalabad and Gharibiya Madrasahs among the oldest centers of knowledge in the Islamic world. The scientist's words were quoted on the official website of the Imam Bukhari International Research Center under the Cabinet of Ministers of the Republic of Uzbekistan, and it was noted that the Kalabad madrasa is the same age as the Abu Hafs Kabir madrasa and that it was built at the beginning of the 9th century, around 800–810.

The waqf document of this higher educational institution dating back to the 11th century has been preserved. During the period of the Uzbek ruler Vali Muhammad (1605–1611), Joybori Abdurahimhoja rebuilt the Kalabad madrasa and presented the Arslankhan madrasa waqf document before the document he drew up when he donated properties to it. In 1124, no other information about the Arslan Khan madrasa, which was restored in Bukhara, has survived except for the fact that it existed. Joyboriy Abdurahimhoja rebuilt this educational institution and restored the previous foundation properties. Researchers such as O. A. Sukhareva, N. Yoldoshev, H. Kurbanov expressed their opinion that the Kalabod madrasa used to be the Arslankhan Madrasah.

Kalabad Madrasah is one of the oldest higher education institutions in the world. A. K. Jumanazar compares the general situation with the situation in Europe and writes the following:

In the 9th–10th centuries, when the Kalabad Madrasah was built, there was no such special higher education institution even in Europe. 500 years later, when Abdurahimhoja restored the Kalabad madrasa for the third time, there was still no higher education institution in Russia

According to M. A. Abbasova-Yusupova, the last restored building of the madrasa was built in the last 1/3 of the 16th century (between 1566–1599) and was completed in 1608–1609. The activity of the madrasa was stopped after the Bukhara revolution of 1920. The madrasa building was used as a prison in the 1930s, and later as a residence belonging to the municipal utility. In the early 1950s, it was still intact but neglected. It was destroyed in 1953. The bricks were first made by K.Y. Voroshilov and were used in the construction of Bukhara School No. 5, which was later named after A. S. Makarenko. Currently, the courtyards are standing in place of the madrasa building.

== Waqf document and property ==
There are three copies of the waqf document of the madrasa. At the top of the document is written "Kalabod Madrasa and Abdurahimhoja Descendants Foundation". It mentions:

Hazrat Khoja Nizamiddin Abdurahimhoja, the most respected among learned scholars and virtuous people, may his state and honor always increase, ordered the construction of a higher madrasa outside the ancient fortress of the proud city of Bukhara, inside the Kalabad Gate, and it was quickly completed in this place

The Waqf document was drawn up in Shawwal 1017 Hijri (April – May 1608) and formalized on the 13th day of Jumad ul-Akhir 1018 (September 14, 1609). The later date is recorded in almost all copies of foundation documents. The original copy of the document has the almond-shaped seal of the Uzbek ruler Vali Muhammad (1605–1611).

According to O. D. Chekhovych, the original foundation document of the Kalabad Madrasah did not mention either the Arslan Khan Madrasah or the villages and gardens belonging to its foundation properties. A. K. Jumanazar, while getting acquainted with the foundation documents of the Kalabad madrasa, informs that Abdurahimhoja, when he was formalizing his foundation, presented the complete foundation of the Arslan Khan madrasa before him, and it was found in two copies that the scientist saw, and it was called the Khan madrasa. "There is no reason to say that the Kalabad madrasa used to be the Arslan Khan madrasa".

The waqf donates its inherited land in the villages of Tally Zogan, Tarnov, Khalaji bolo, and Khalaji poyon in Khayrabad and Samjan districts for this madrasa and its descendants. According to the waqf conditions, the mutawalli waqf himself and the most knowledgeable and righteous person among his descendants are appointed to this task. If they are tied on both sides, the issue will be decided by drawing lots. The proceeds of the waqfs are first used for the needs of the madrasa building. Mutavalli takes a tithe from the increase. The rest will be divided into two halves for his descendants and madrasa activities. The mutavalli distributes the part of it related to the madrasa in the following order:

During Ramadan, 1 manna of flour and 1 manna of wheat for making halim are bought every day. Meat and ingredients are bought for four silver coins of one misqal and used to cook halim. These foods are given to those who come to the madrasa for iftar. Every day during this month, a quarter (rubbi yak) coin is given to the cook. Mutavalli buys 10 mats for the madrasah mosque and classroom every 2 years, and a new mat every year. He gives 1 coin to the muezzin every month to buy candles for the mosque. The rest of this half is divided into 10 parts. From it, 1 share is allocated to the imam, muezzin, and mosque employee. It is divided into 5 parts, from which the imam receives 3, the muezzin 1, the employee of the mosque, and madrasa 1. This employee works as a cleaner. In winter, it heats the ablution water. Of the remaining 9 parts, 3 parts will be distributed to two mudarris and 6 parts to students studying in the Madrasah.

In the document issued in 1293 Hijri (1876), the names of tax-collecting Madrasahs and the amount of taxes collected from them are given. In it, the rent of the Kalabad madrasa is set at 7000 tangas, and the tithe is 700 tangas.

== Educational system ==
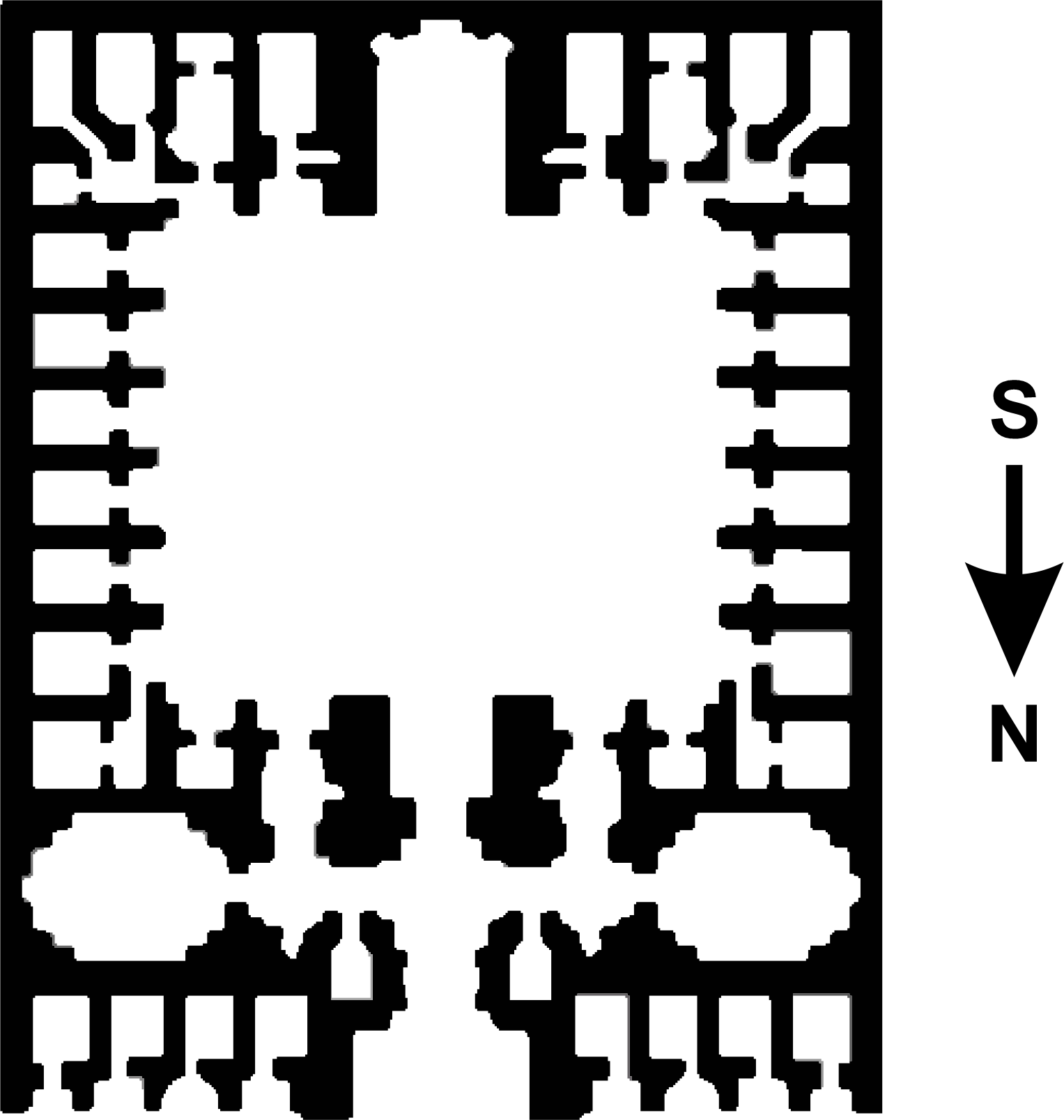
Kalabad madrasa drawing

According to the 12th issue of the Shuro magazine published in Orenburg in 1916, the Kalabad madrasa was included in the series of "higher" category madrasas of Bukhara, and its annual waqf profit was 80,000 tanga. A. K. Jumanazar, in his monograph on the history of the Bukhara educational system and madrasas, based on "certain laws and social signs" in the educational system, conditionally includes the Kalabad madrasa among the Madrasahs of the 3rd level. Madrasahs of this category were taught by teachers of different backgrounds.

Two teachers taught in the Kalabad madrasa 200 students were educated. According to several historical documents, mudarris were paid 45–60 gold each. In a historical source, the names of several such mudarris are Mullah Rahmatullah and Mullah Said. None of the persons related to the activities of the madrasa should leave the madrasa for two months without a valid reason.

A. K. Jumanazar assumes that scholars of the Middle Ages, such as Imam al-Bukhari, Abu Hafs al-Kabir, Abu Hafs al-Saghir, Ishaq al-Kalabadi, Abu Ali ibn Sina, studied in the Kalabad madrasa. Later, on the official website of the Imam Bukhari International Scientific Research Center under the Cabinet of Ministers of the Republic of Uzbekistan, it is noted that Imam al-Bukhari and many other famous historical figures were educated in the Kalabad madrasa. In the book published by the International Islamic Academy of Uzbekistan, it is said that Imam al-Bukhari started his first Madrasah education at this school.

== Architecture ==
Kalabad Madrasah was one of the largest Madrasahs in Bukhara in terms of size and scope. It is made of baked brick in the traditional style of Turanian Madrasah construction, with a square layout, two floors, and two porches.

The front facade of the Madrasah consists of the main entrance and two wings. The peshtok is installed from the north to the south of the longitudinal axis. Information about the remnants of tiled coverings has been preserved on the facade. The wings included two-story rooms. Madrasah is entered through the front gate. Behind the gate is a miyansarai, through which the corridors leading to the madrasa courtyard pass, and on both sides of it there are madrasa halls (mosque and classroom). The courtyard behind Peshtok is surrounded by many cells. It is said that his classroom was large and had 100 rooms for students. Based on the information found by O. A. Sukhareva, researchers report that the number of madrasa cells was 100 or about 100. According to other sources, their number reached 79.

The peculiarity of Madrasah architecture is that there are no flower bouquets installed on the corners of the walls on both sides of the main facade; there was a special porch under the roof arches, equal to the second floor. Later, this style was used in Khorezm madrasahs; the yard did not have corner sections and edges.

According to the foundation document of the Madrasah, it also had toilets. The street is in the west and north, and the east and south sides are surrounded by courtyards. According to the sources, in front of the Madrasah, there is a Kalabad mosque and a pool, which have not been preserved. According to the research, there was a separate library of the Madrasah.

== Library ==
There is no mention of a library in the foundation document of the Kalabad madrasa. However, as a result of A. K. Jumanazar's research, it was found that several manuscript books were copied from this school of science. The name of the madrasa appears in several forms in the scribe texts. Here are some examples of such manuscripts.

Manuscript	Author	Year	Secretary	Copied year	Copied place	Description
Sharh ul-muvofiq	Sayyid Sharif Jurjoniy	1404	Kotib Hoji Qurbon ibn Muhammad Zarmitaniy	1631–1632	Abdurahimkhoja Madrasah	ShQM, №2577
Sharh aqoid ul-auzdiya	Jaloliddin Davvoniy	1499	Kotib Toshkandiy	1812	Kalobot Madrasah	ShQM, № 12959/2 (1b—85b)
Hoshiya sharh al-aqoid hoshiya aʼla sharh an-Nasafiya	Ahmad ibn Umar al-Jandiy	13th century	Kotib Muhammad Musa ibn mulla Safiyulloh Badaxshoniy	1887–1888	Kalabod Madrasah	ShQM, № 744/1 (1b—144a)
Hall abyot va oyat va amsol sharhi mulla	Shamsiddin Muhammad	—	Kotib Sayyid Alixoja Ustrushaniy	1849	Kalonobod Madrasah	ShQM, № 6590/9 (195b—231a)
Hoshiya bar sharhi "Tahzib" Davvoniy	Abduhakim ibn Shamsiddin	—	Kotib Muhammad Moʻmin ibn mulla Nur Muhammad	1821–1822	Kalonobod Madrasah	ShQM, № 7161 (1b—242b)
Hoshiya aʼla sharh at-talxis	Mir Sayyid Sharif	—	Kotib Yusuf ibn Jaloliddin Hisoriy	1614–1615	Kalabon Madrasah	ShQM, № 7173 (1b—167a)

== Stories related to construction ==
According to A. K. Jumanazar, O. A. Sukhareva doubts the antiquity of the Kalabad madrasa and cites two unreliable narratives related to its construction.

O. A. Sukhareva notes that one of them is reflected in motifs typical of Tajik folklore. According to legend, the Madrasah was built overnight by miraculous powers. Amir Temur fought a military war with the ruler of Koqan, and when it was becoming clear that he would be defeated, a group of bald men saved him by showing amazing courage and tenacity and chased the enemy away. Amir asks Temur what he can do for them. The Kallar group requested that a madrassa be built for them and hence the higher education institution was named Kalabad.

According to another legend, Amir Temur fights for the throne against the ruler of Ferghana. In Fergana, inscriptions appear that no one could read. Khoja Ishaq Kalabadi, who knows all languages of the world, serves in the palace of Amir Temur. Amir Temur sends him to Ferghana. When Hoja read the inscriptions, they were written in Greek. They are said to contain instructions that the throne should belong to Amir Temur. Enraged by this comment, the ruler of Ferghana orders to kill the owner. His body was brought to Bukhara and buried, and the Kalabad madrasa was built over his grave.

The last narrative does not correspond to the facts known to the people of Bukhara. Abu Bakr Ishaq Kalabadi Mausoleum is located outside Mazari Sharif gate. According to O. A. Sukhareva, the saint was honored as the protector of Bukhara and was called the "Gate of Bukhara" because the tomb is located in front of the city gate.
