= Chor-Bakr =

Memorial complex in Sumitan, Uzbekistan

Coordinates: 39°46′28″N 64°20′4″E

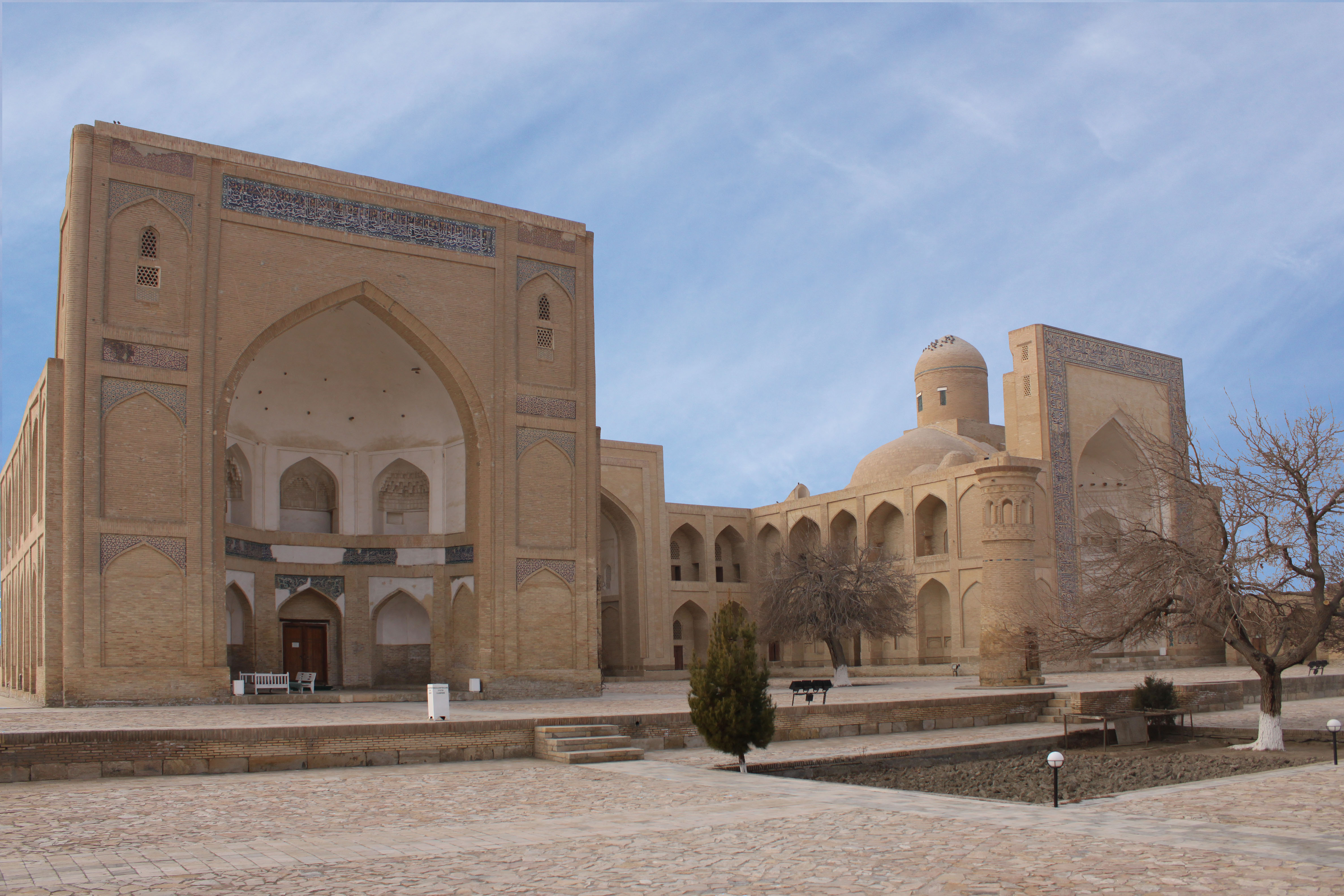
Chor-Bakr

Chor-Bakr is a memorial complex in the village of Sumitan at 5 km of Bukhara in Uzbekistan.

== History ==
The Chor Bakr Memorial Complex, also known as Sumitan's cemetery, was established by Shaybanid ruler Abdullaxon II in 1559, and it includes a mausoleum, a mosque, a madrasa, and a large courtyard surrounded by high walls. In the following centuries, additional buildings were constructed, and the complex was expanded to include adjacent areas. Abdullaxon II allocated 70,000 gold coins for the construction of this memorial complex. The central building of the complex is the mausoleum, which has doors on all four sides. The mausoleum has a two-story structure with two rooms and a domed chamber on top. The mihrab (prayer niche) is located on the qibla side of the mausoleum. The dome of the mausoleum is built in the Arki duzi style. The verses 61 and 62 of Surah Al-Baqara are inscribed on the front facade of the mausoleum. The courtyard measures 20 meters in length, while the front entrance is 12 meters wide.

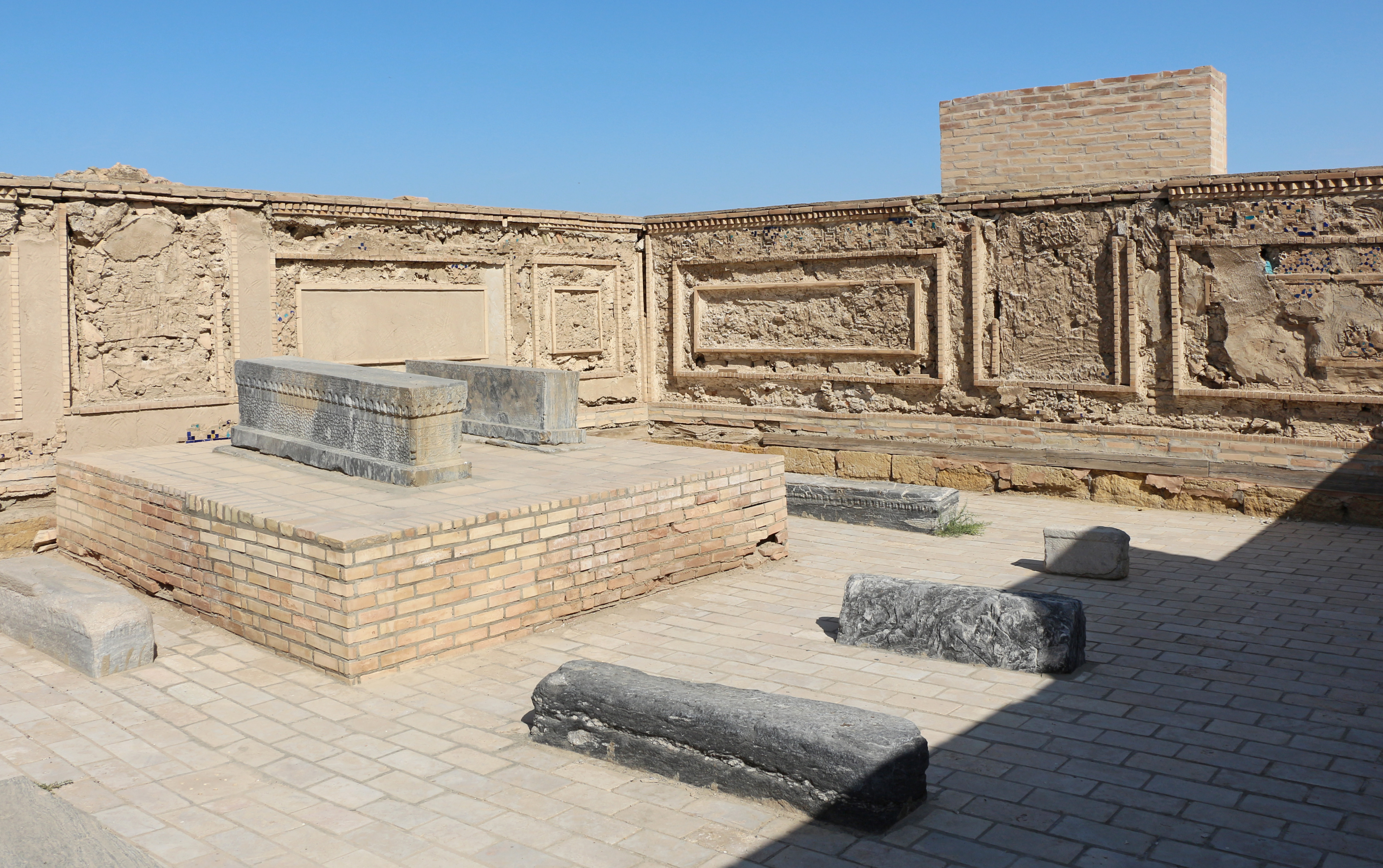
Tombs at Chor-Bakr Mausoleum

The Chor Bakr Madrasah in the Chor Bakr Memorial Complex is one of the highest-ranking madrasas and underwent renovation work in 1950, 1971, and 1999. The mosque within the complex is elegantly designed and contains chambers in its front section. The Surah Al-Isra is inscribed on the front of the mosque. The doors of the mosque are made from the wood of the pine tree, native to Bukhara. The minaret in the complex was constructed in 1890 by Mirzo Hoji Joʻyboriy and stands above the previous minaret's foundation. The area of the complex covers 40 hectares, with the cemetery section occupying 12 hectares. In the Chor Bakr Memorial Complex, there is also the mausoleum of Sa'dulla Khoja, which is located to the south of the central mausoleum. The mausoleum has three chambers on its eastern side. Inside the mausoleum, there are rooms and graves. In addition to this, the complex houses the mausoleums of Akobir Khoja, Nasriddin Khoja, Abdulaziz Khoja, Atoullo Khoja, Zaynab Sulton Khoja, Obid Khoja, Poshshooyim Khoja, Sa'dulla Khoja, and other khwajas (religious leaders).

== World Heritage Status ==
This site was added to the UNESCO World Heritage Tentative List on 18 January 2008, in the Cultural category. It was finally listed as a World Heritage Site in 2023 as part of the Silk Roads: Zarafshan-Karakum Corridor listing.
