= Chashma-Ayub Mausoleum =

Historic site in Uzbekistan

Coordinates: 39°46′41″N 64°24′08″E

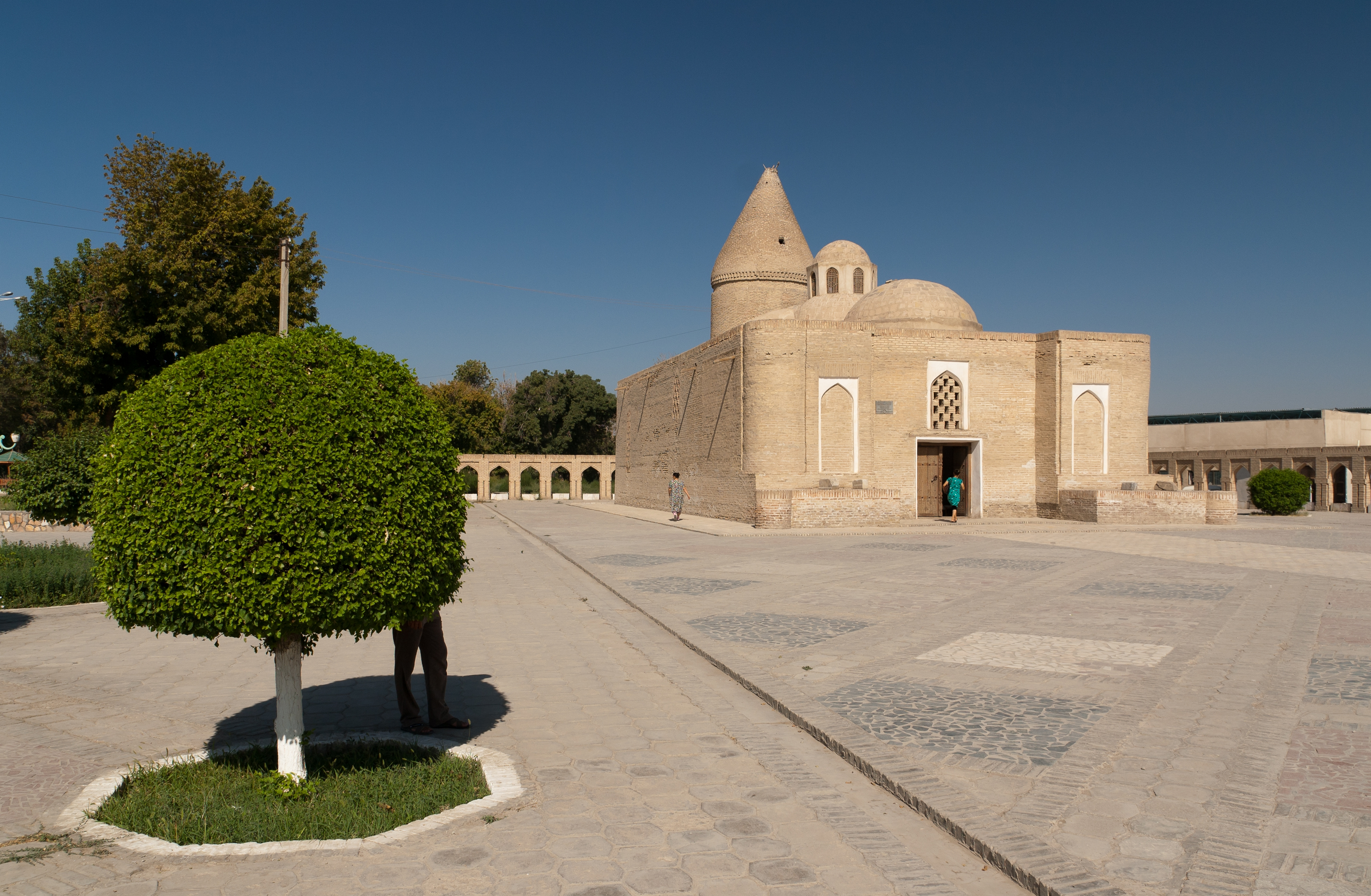
Chashma-Ayub Mausoleum

Chashma-Ayub Mausoleum (Uzbek: Chashmai Ayyub, lit. 'Job's Well') is located near the Samani Mausoleum, in Bukhara, Uzbekistan. Its name means Job's well, due to the legend in which Job (Ayub) visited this place and made a well by striking the ground with his staff. The water of this well is still pure and is considered healing. The current building was constructed during the reign of Timur and features a Khwarazm-style conical dome uncommon in Bukhara.

== History ==
Chashmai Ayyub is also revered as a burial place. Originally, this site is believed to contain the mausoleum of the Prophet Ayyub. This site has been constructed over several centuries. The oldest part of the object dates back to the 12th century. An inscription from the year 1380 is still preserved on a stone at this site. Inscriptions from the 16th century can also be found. The building was constructed by Khorezmian craftsmen following Amir Temur's campaign to Khorezm. There are several tombs in Chashma-Ayub, the oldest of which is the tomb of the famous theologian and muhaddi Khwaja Hafiz Gunjari, who was buried here in 1022. Chashmai Ayyub also has a mausoleum.

It was built by a person named Amir Hajjoj during Amir Temur's reign and still stands next to the current mausoleum building. During the reign of Shaybanid ruler Abdullaxon II, the Chashmai Ayyub complex underwent extensive renovations, and construction work was completed. The main entrance to the site faces east, and there is a special chamber inside. Behind the chamber, there is a mihrab, and it is within this chamber that the footprint of Prophet Ayyub, or his mausoleum, is located. Above the door of the mihrab, there is an inscribed wooden board that tells of Prophet Ayyub's visit to Bukhara. Today, Chashmai Ayyub houses a historical museum dedicated to the history of water supply in Bukhara.

== Architectural Structure ==
The sacred pilgrimage site has a rectangular layout (19x26 meters) and consists of four rooms arranged from west to east, each enclosed with distinctive domes. The oldest room is the square one (4.5 x 4.5 meters) known as the well, which is traditionally attributed to have been built by Arslonxon during the time of the Kalyan Minaret and Namozgoh Mosque. On either side of this room, there are two annexes intended for the convenience of pilgrims. To the left, there is a smaller square room (4.5x4.5 meters) attached to the main building, which serves as an anteroom. To the right, there is another annex with additional domes. The inscription mentions the construction of a grand chamber with a tall dome and minarets during Amir Temur's reign in 1379, according to his command. The inner part of the building contains the ancient elements that have survived over time.

== World Heritage Status ==
This site was added to the UNESCO World Heritage Tentative List on 18 January 2008, in the Cultural category.
