= Bukhara =

City in southeastern Uzbekistan

Bukhara Buxoro / Бухоро (Uzbek)
- District-level city
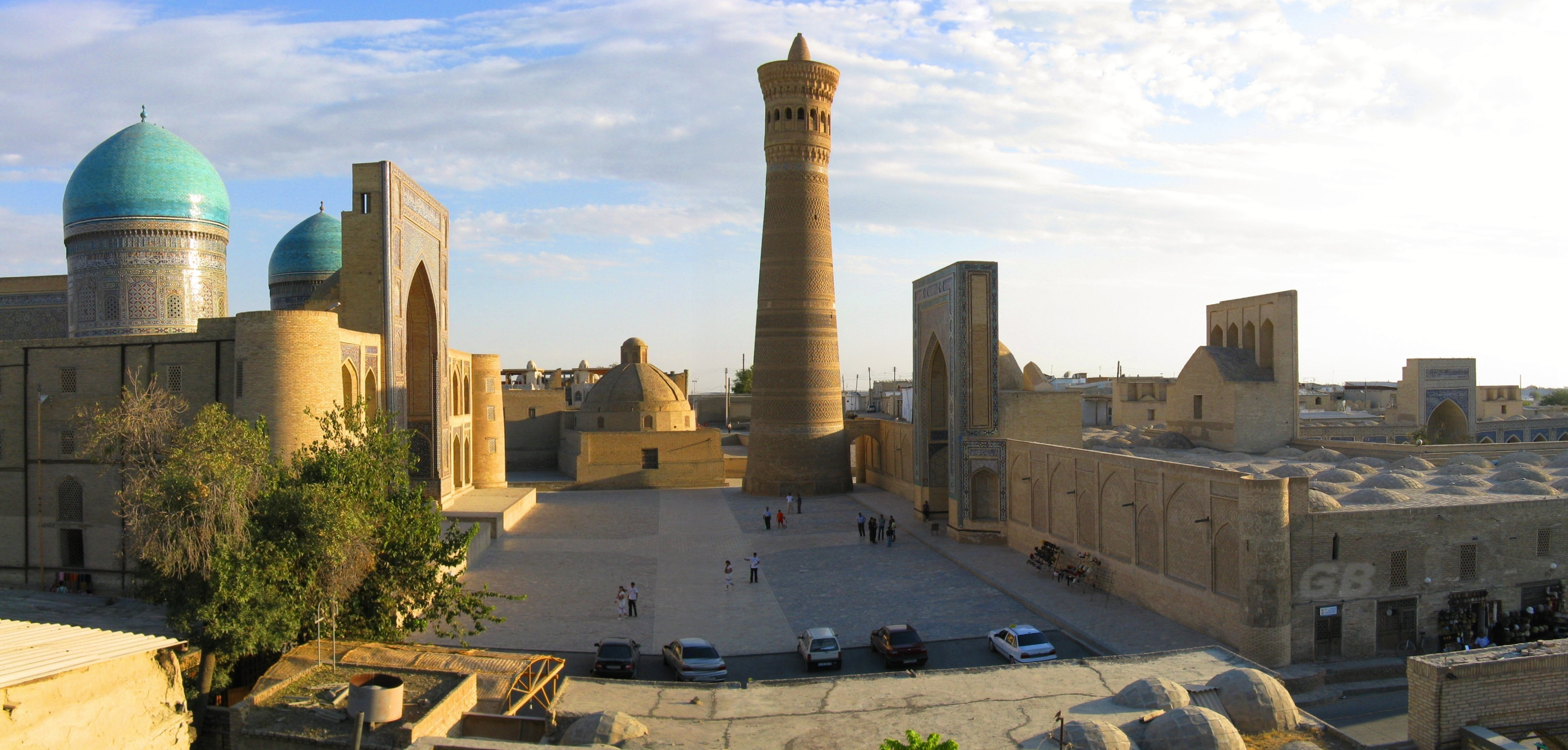
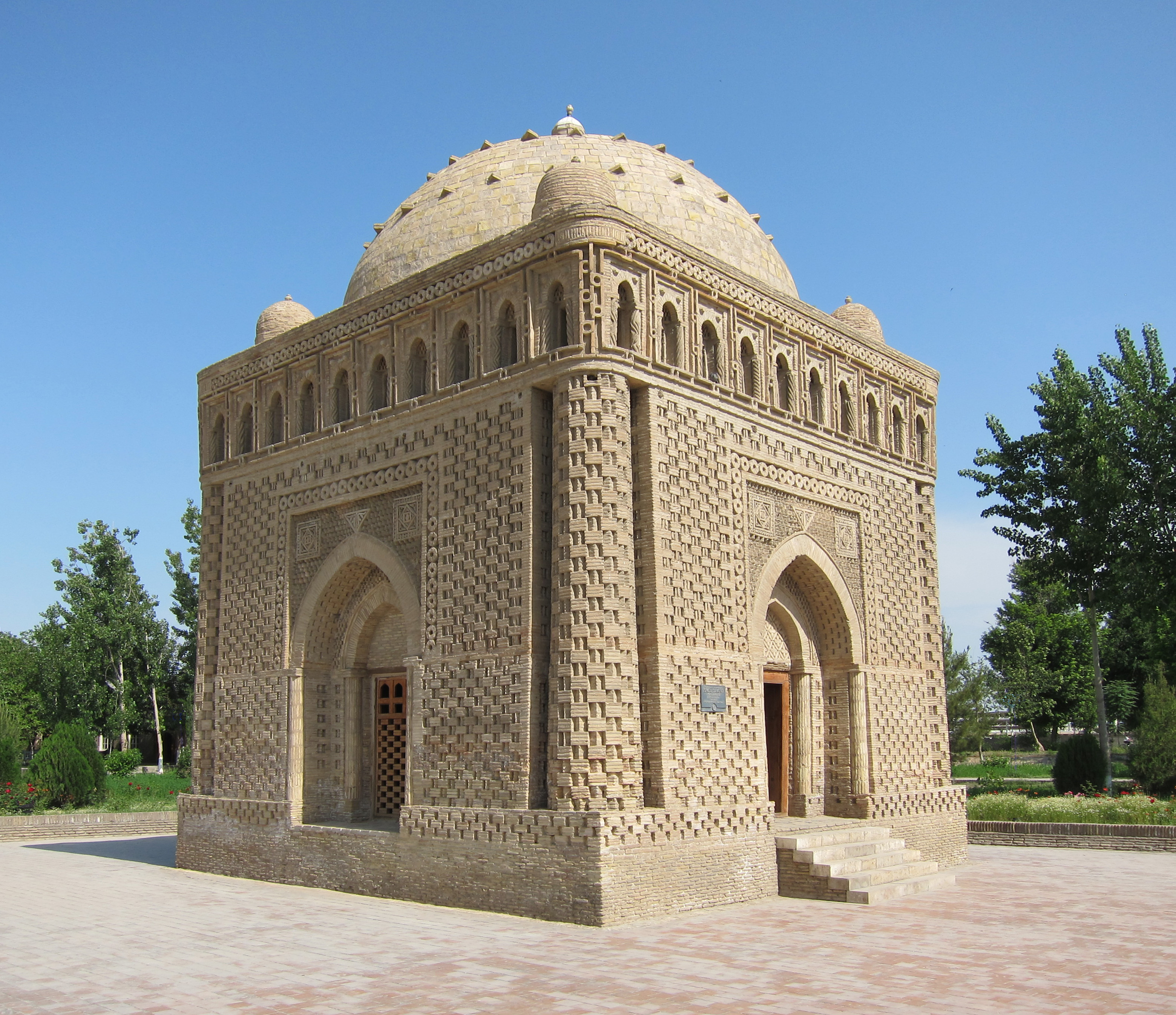
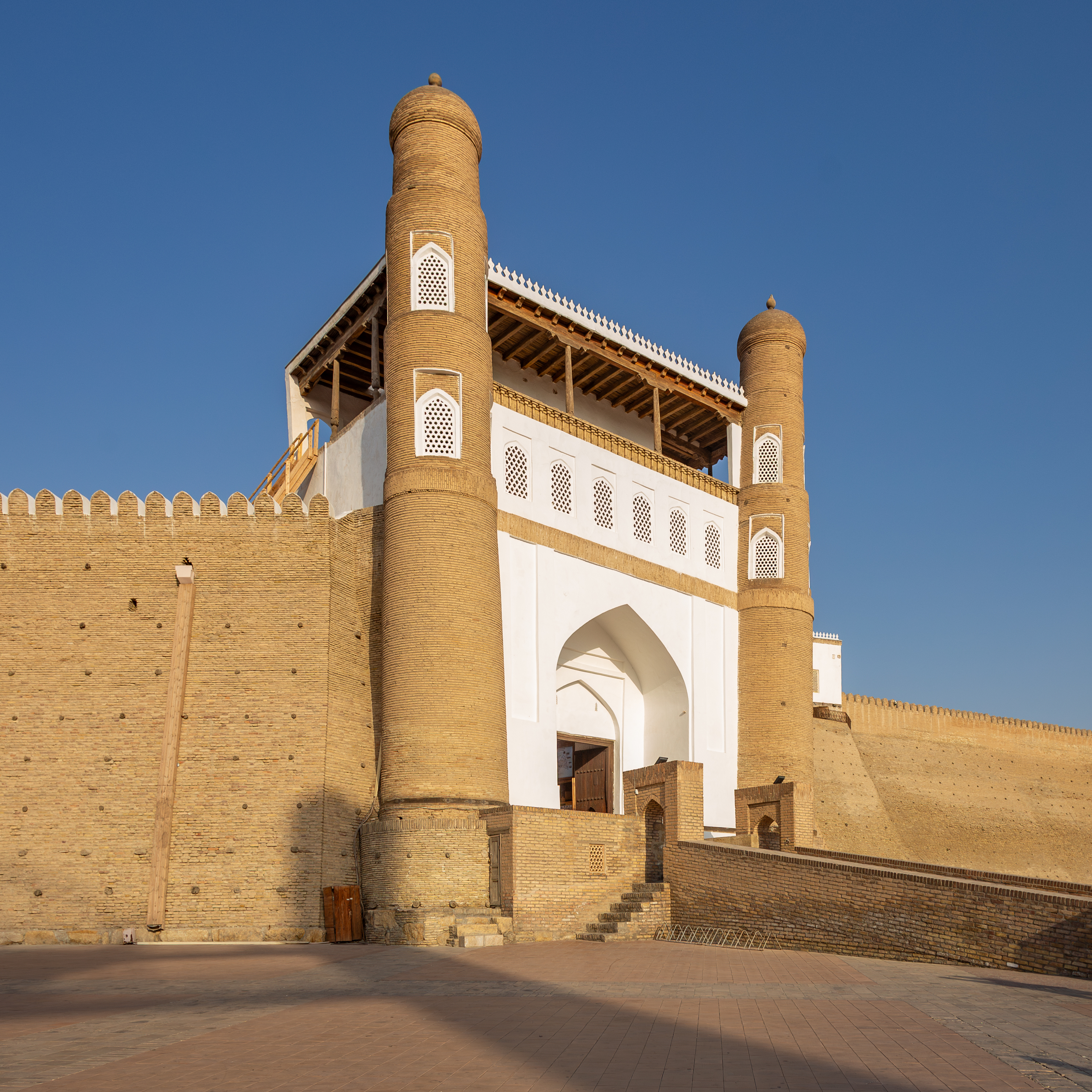
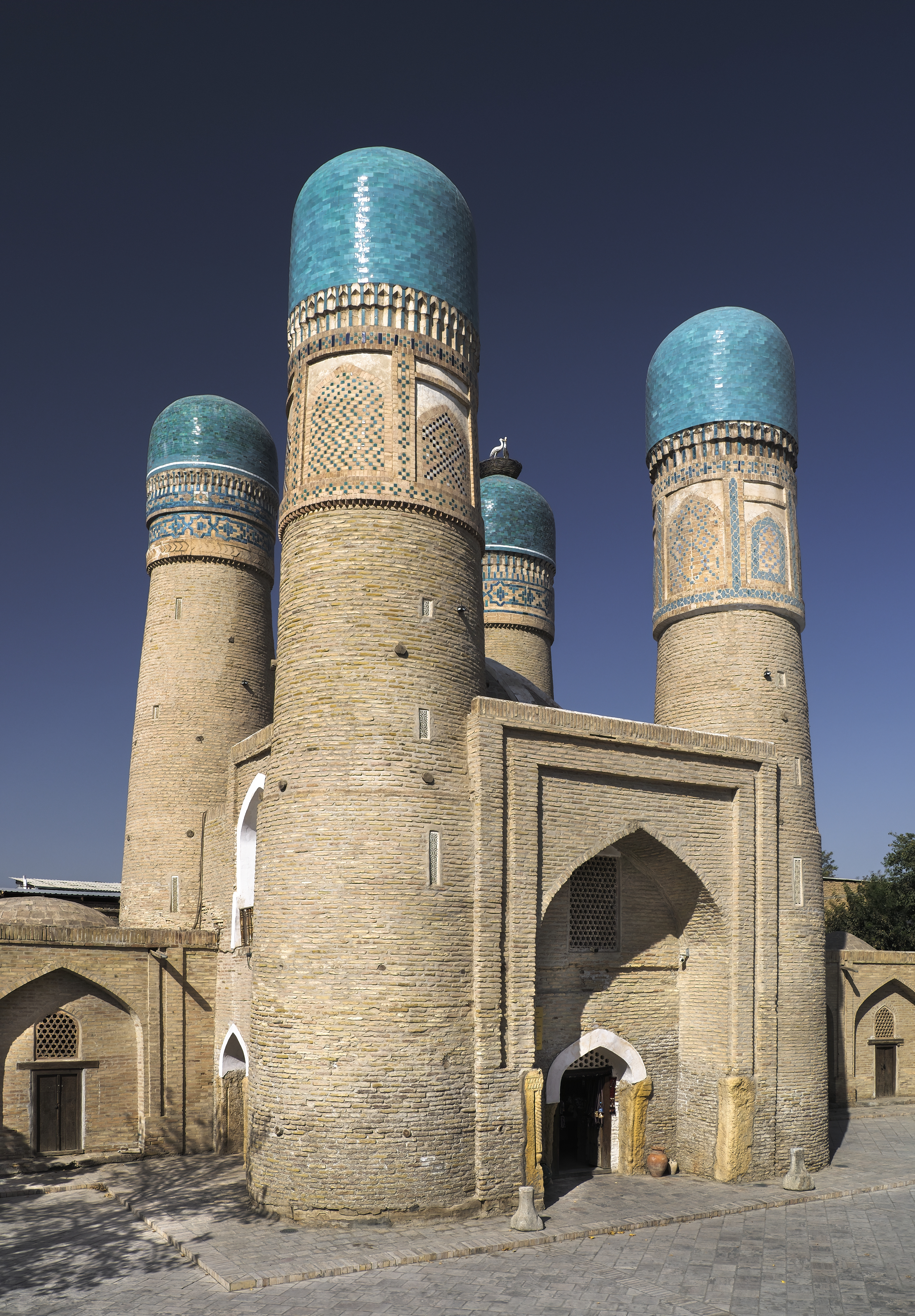
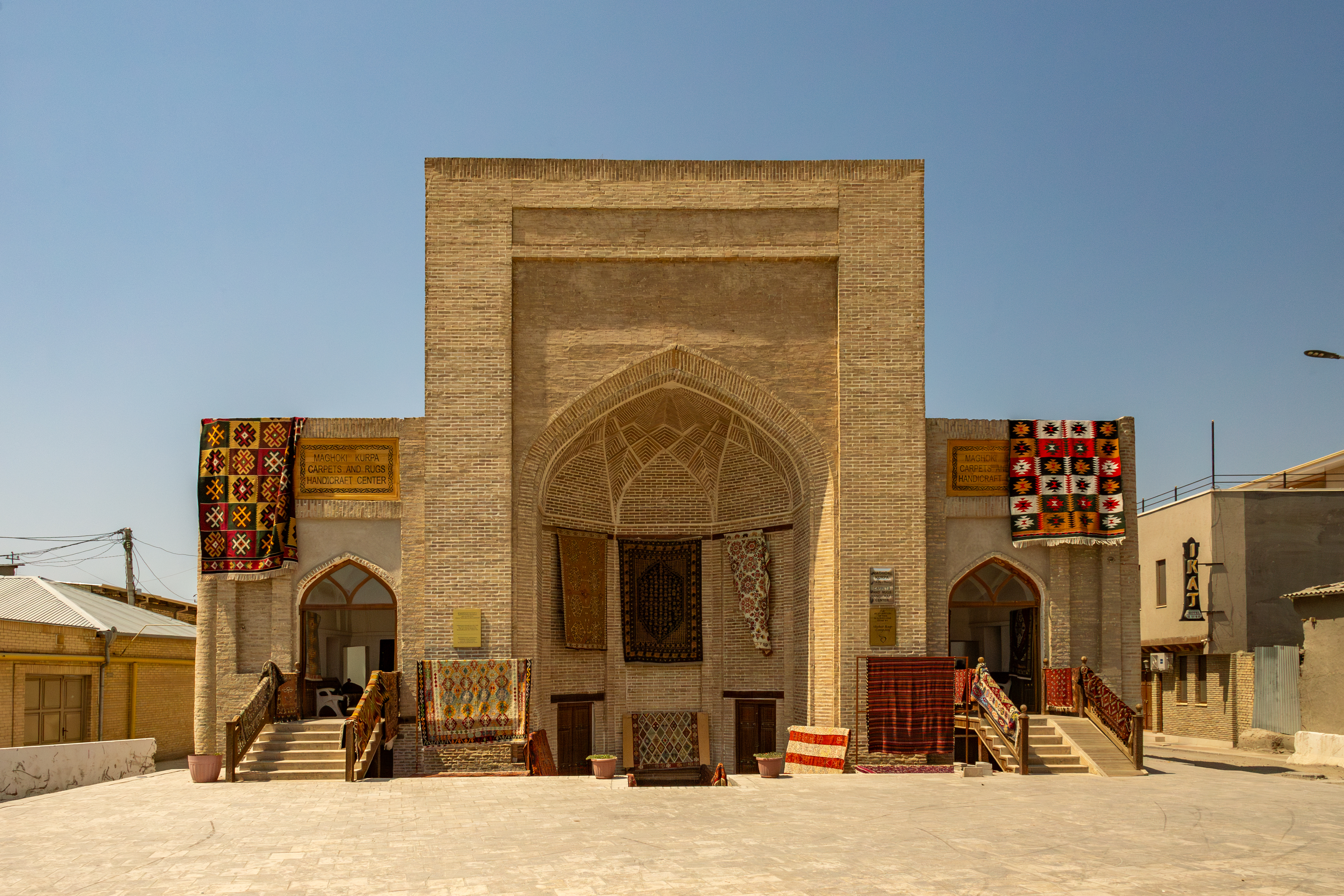
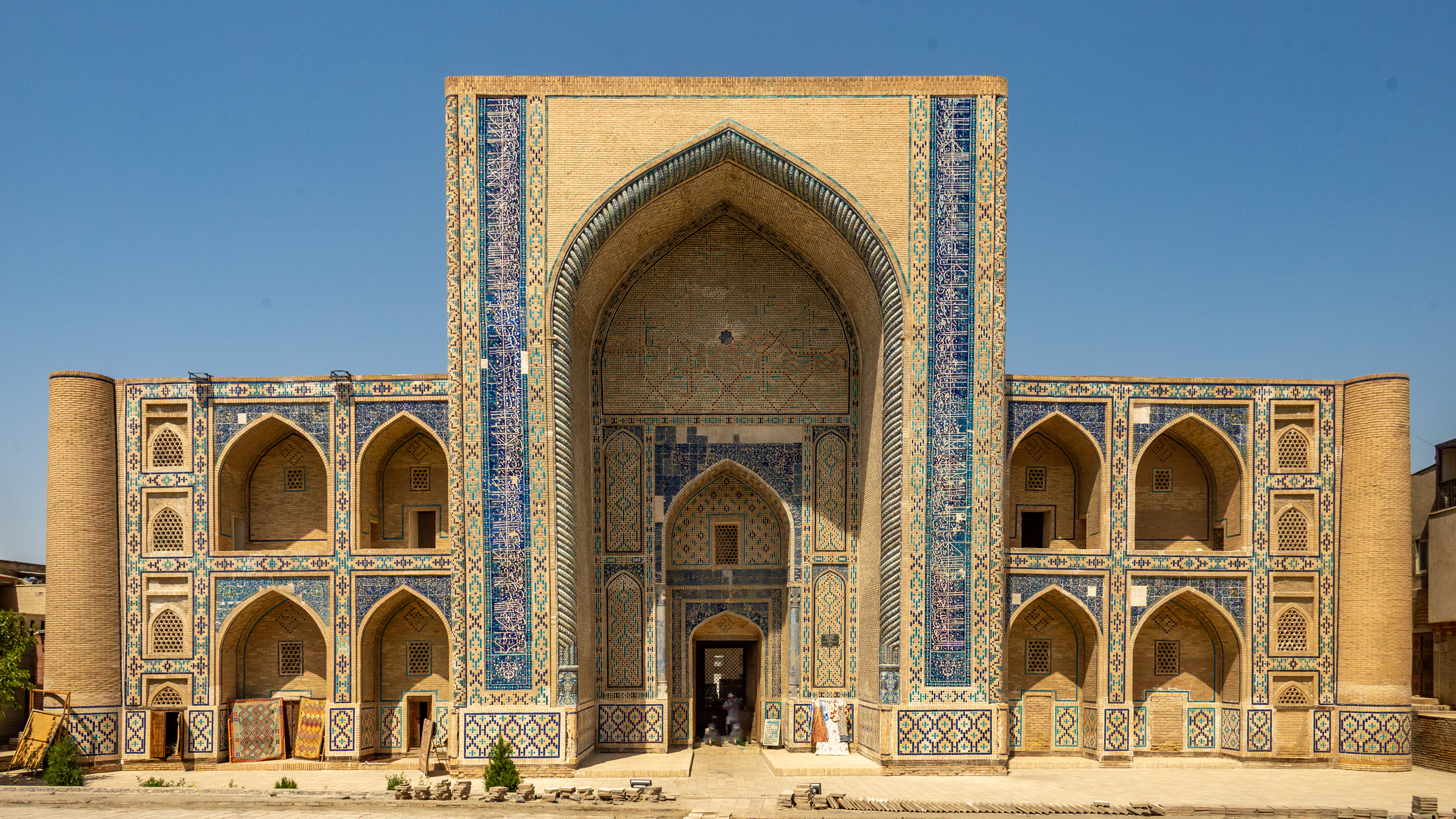
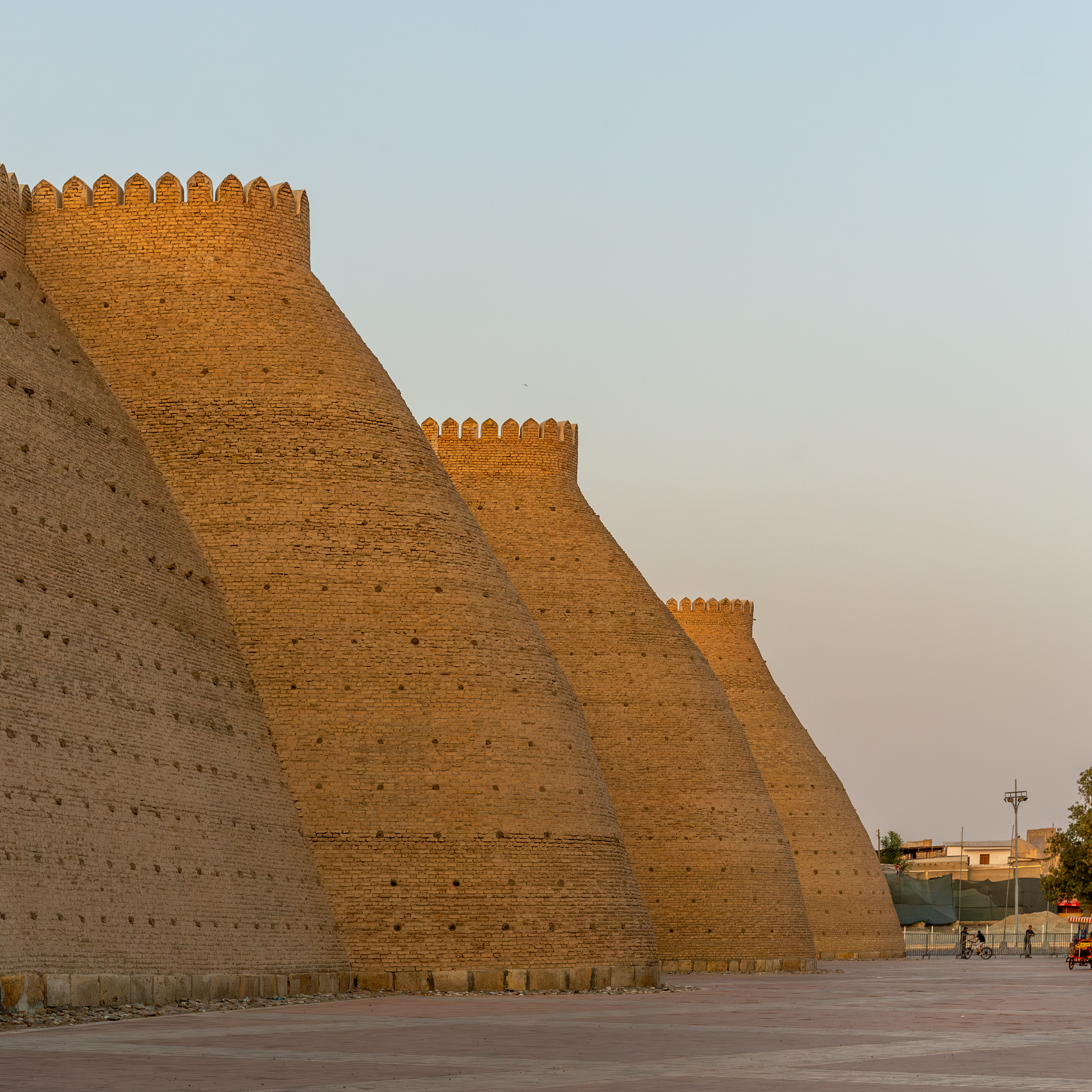
- Po-i-Kalyan Complex Samani Mausoleum Ark of Bukhara Chor Minor Magok-i-Kurpa Ulugbek Madrasah Bukhara Ark Walls

- Location in Uzbekistan Bukhara (West and Central Asia)
- Coordinates: 39°46′00″N 64°25′23″E
- Country: Uzbekistan
- Region: Bukhara
- Founded: 6th century BC
- First mention: 500 AD

Government
  - Type: City Administration
  - Hakim (Mayor): Qurbon Tursunov

Area
  - District-level city: 143.0 km^{2} (55.2 sq mi)
  - Urban: 73.0 km^{2} (28.2 sq mi)
- Elevation: 225 m (738 ft)

Population (2026)
  - District-level city: 305,500
  - Density: 2,136/km^{2} (5,533/sq mi)
- Demonym: Buxorolik • Bukharian
- Time zone: UTC+05:00 (UZT)
- Postcode: 2001ХХ
- Area code: (+998) 65
- Vehicle registration: 20 (previous to 2008); 80-84 (2008 and newer)
- HDI (2018): 0.734 · 5th high
- Website: www.buxoro.uz

UNESCO World Heritage Site
- Official name: Historic Centre of Bukhara
- Type: Cultural
- Criteria: ii, iv, vi
- Designated: 1993
- Reference no.: 602
- Region: Asia

Bukhara (/bʊˈxɑːrə/ buu-KHAR-ə) (Note: Uzbek: Buxoro [bʊχɒˈɾɒ]; Tajik: Бухоро, Bukharian dialect: בוכארא [bʊχɔˈɾɔ]; Persian: بخارا Boxârâ [boχɒːˈɾɒː]; Russian: Бухара [bʊxɐˈra]) is the seventh-largest city in Uzbekistan by population, with 305,500 residents as of 2026. It is the capital of Bukhara Region. Since ancient times, Bukhara was one of the most prosperous cities in Transoxiana alongside neighboring Samarkand owing to its location on the Silk Road. Today its historic core is a UNESCO World Heritage Site.

Dating to pre-Islamic antiquity, Bukhara became a major centre of Islamic sciences and scholarship during the Islamic Golden Age. It was the birthplace of the scholar Imam Bukhari. Bukhara was a major city in the Samanid Empire, and later, in the Karakhanid Khanate; both empires have left monuments such as Samanid Mausoleum and Kalan Minaret in the city. Bukhara was devastated during the Mongol invasion under Genghis Khan in the 13th century but recovered under the Timurid Empire in the next century. It became capital of the Uzbek Khanate of Bukhara in the 16th century. The Uzbek state added a number of monuments, mosques and madrasas, such as the Po-i-Kalyan complex to the landscape of the city. The Emirate of Bukhara was abolished after the Russian Revolution in 1920, and the Bukhara People’s Soviet Republic was created, later transformed into Uzbek Soviet Socialist Republic in 1924.

Bukhara has about 140 architectural monuments, including the massive fortifications of Ark of Bukhara. UNESCO has listed the historic center of Bukhara (which contains numerous mosques and madrasas) as a World Heritage Site.

== Names ==
The exact name of the city of Bukhara in ancient times is unknown. The whole oasis was called Bukhara in ancient times, and probably only in the tenth century was it finally transferred to the city.

According to some scholars, the name dates back to the Sanskrit vihāra (Buddhist monastery). This word is very close to the word in the language of the Uyghur and Chinese Buddhists, who named their places of worship the same way. Very few artifacts related to Buddhism have survived into the modern day in the city. But, numerous Arabic, Persian, European and Chinese travellers and historians noted the place and Transoxiana itself to be once populated by mostly Buddhists and few Zoroastrians. Indeed, the first Islamic text on Bukhara relates to the first Arab invader of Bukhara, Ubaidullah bin Ziad, who noted Bukhara to be a Buddhist country with Buddhist monasteries ruled by a queen regent acting on behalf of her son.

According to other sources (such as Encyclopædia Iranica), the name Bukhara is possibly derived from the Sogdian βuxārak ('Place of Good Fortune'), a name for Buddhist monasteries.

In the Tang dynasty, and other successive dynasties of Imperial China, Bukhara was known under the name of Bǔhē (捕喝), which has been replaced in Chinese by the modern generic phonetic spelling Bùhālā (布哈拉).

Between the 19th and 20th centuries, Bukhara was known as Bokhara in the English publications as exemplified by the writings and reports on the Emirate of Bukhara during the Great Game.

Muhammad ibn Jafar Narshakhi in his History of Bukhara (completed AD 943–44) mentions:

Bukhara has many names. One of its names was Numijkat. It has also been called "Bumiskat". It has 2 names in Arabic. One is "Madinat al Sufriya" meaning—"the copper city" and another is "Madinat Al Tujjar" meaning—"The city of Merchants". But, the name Bukhara is the original name and more known than all the other names. In Khorasan, there is no other city with so many names.

Since the Middle Ages, the city has been known as Bukhārā / بخارا in Arabic and Persian sources. The modern Uzbek spelling is Buxoro.

The city's name was mythologized as Albracca in the Italian epic poem Orlando Innamorato, published in 1483 by Matteo Maria Boiardo.

== History ==
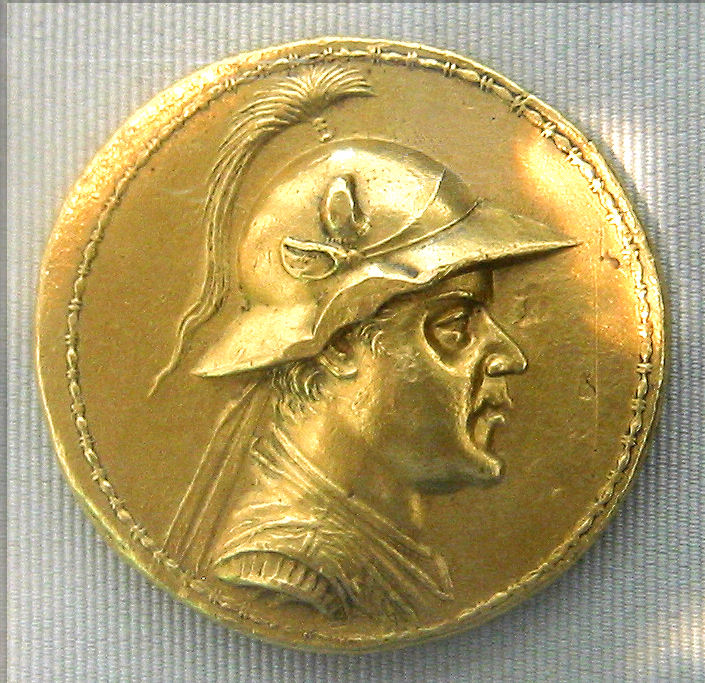
Coin belonging to the Greco-Bactrian Kingdom found in Bukhara

The history of Bukhara stretches back millennia. Along with Samarkand, Bukhara was the epicentre of Persian culture in medieval Central Asia until the fall of Timurid dynasty. Located west of Samarkand, it was a prominent center of learning, well-known throughout the Persian and Islamic world. It served as the most important of cities in many Persianate empires, including Samanids, Karakhanids, Khwarazmians, and Timurids. The historic center of Bukhara, which contains numerous mosques and madrassas, has been listed by UNESCO as a World Heritage Site.

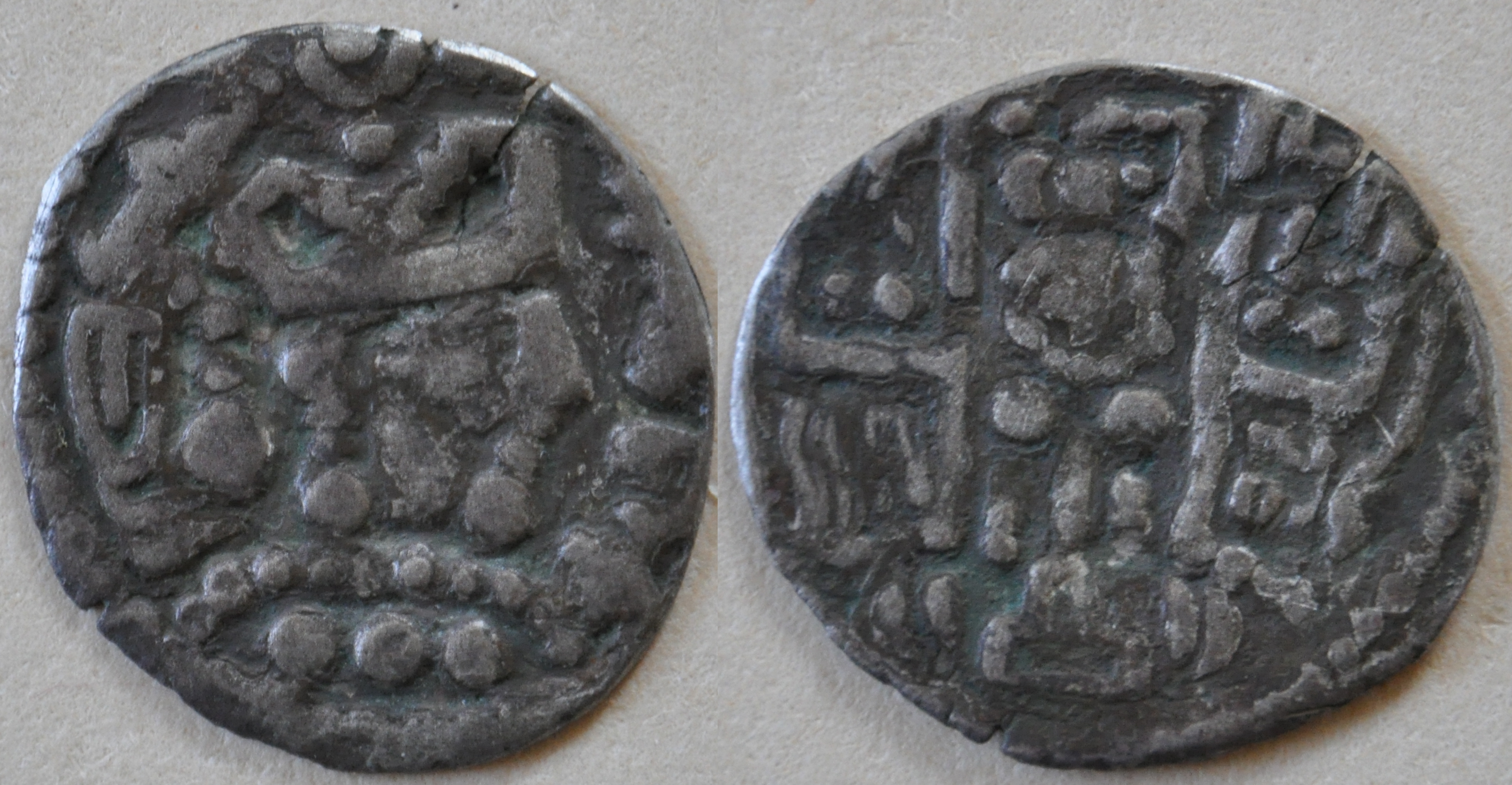
Bukhara coinage of Abbasid caliph al-Mahdi. Bukhara was under Caliphate control until AD 861.

By 850, Bukhara served as the capital of the Samanid Empire, and was the birthplace of Imam Bukhari. The Samanids claimed descent from Bahram Chobin, the Sasanian general and king. They rejuvenated Persian culture far from Baghdad, the centre of the Islamic world. New Persian flourished in Bukhara. Rudaki, the father of Persian poetry, was born and raised in Bukhara and wrote his most famous poem about the beauty of the city. Located on the Silk Road, the city became a center of trade, scholarship, culture, and religion. During the golden age of the Samanids, Bukhara was a major intellectual center of the Islamic world, renowned for its numerous libraries.

At the beginning of the 11th century, Bukhara became part of the Turkic Kara-Khanid Khanate. The Karakhanids built many buildings in Bukhara: the Kalyan Minaret, the Magok-i-Attari Mosque, palaces and parks. Genghis Khan besieged Bukhara for 15 days in 1220, followed by its complete destruction.

As an important trading centre, Bukhara was home to a community of medieval merchants from the city of Multan (present-day Pakistan) who were noted to own land in the city. Bukhara was the old neighborhood of Sheikh Baha' al-Din Naqshband. He was a central figure in the development of the Naqshbandi Sufi order, significantly influencing the mystical Sufi approach to spirituality, theology, and Islamic practice. The influence of Bukhara in the wider Islamic world started to diminish after the arrival of Turkic dynasty of Uzbeks in the 16th century. For several centuries, the cities of Bukhara and Khiva were known as major centers of the slave trade, and due to the Bukhara slave trade, alongside the neighboring slave trade in Khiva, both have been referred to as the "slave capitals of the world".

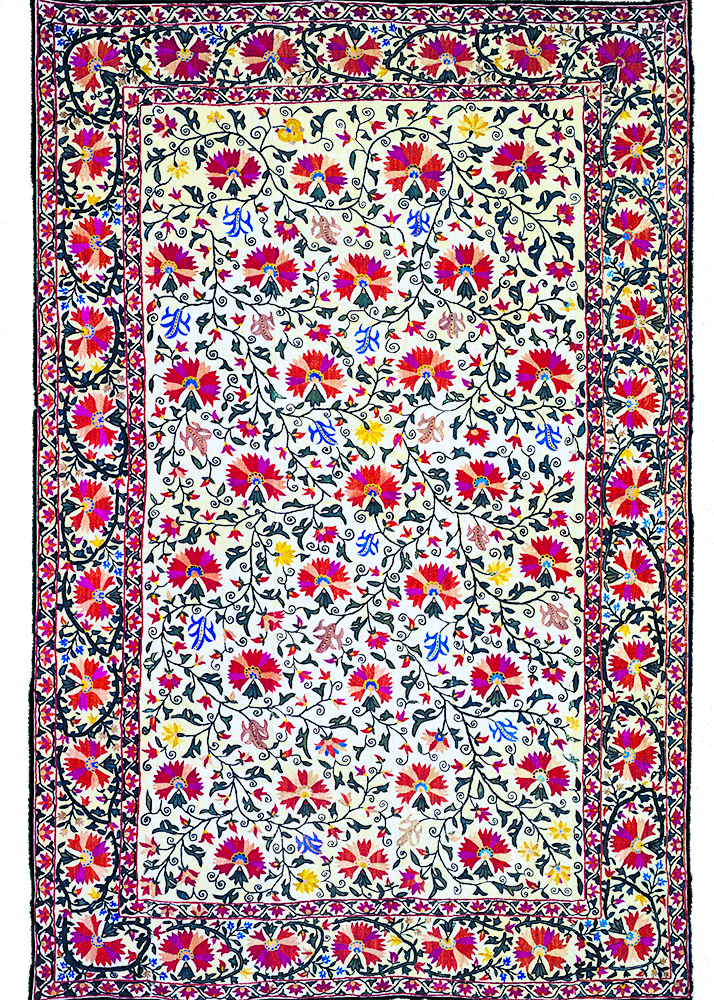
Suzani textiles from Bukhara are famous worldwide. This one was made before 1850.

Agha Mohammad Khan Qajar was the last Persian emperor who attempted to capture the city just before his assassination, and by the 19th century the city had become a peripheral city in the Persian and the Islamic world, being ruled by local Emirs of Bukhara, who were the last Persianate princes before the fall of the city to the Red Army.

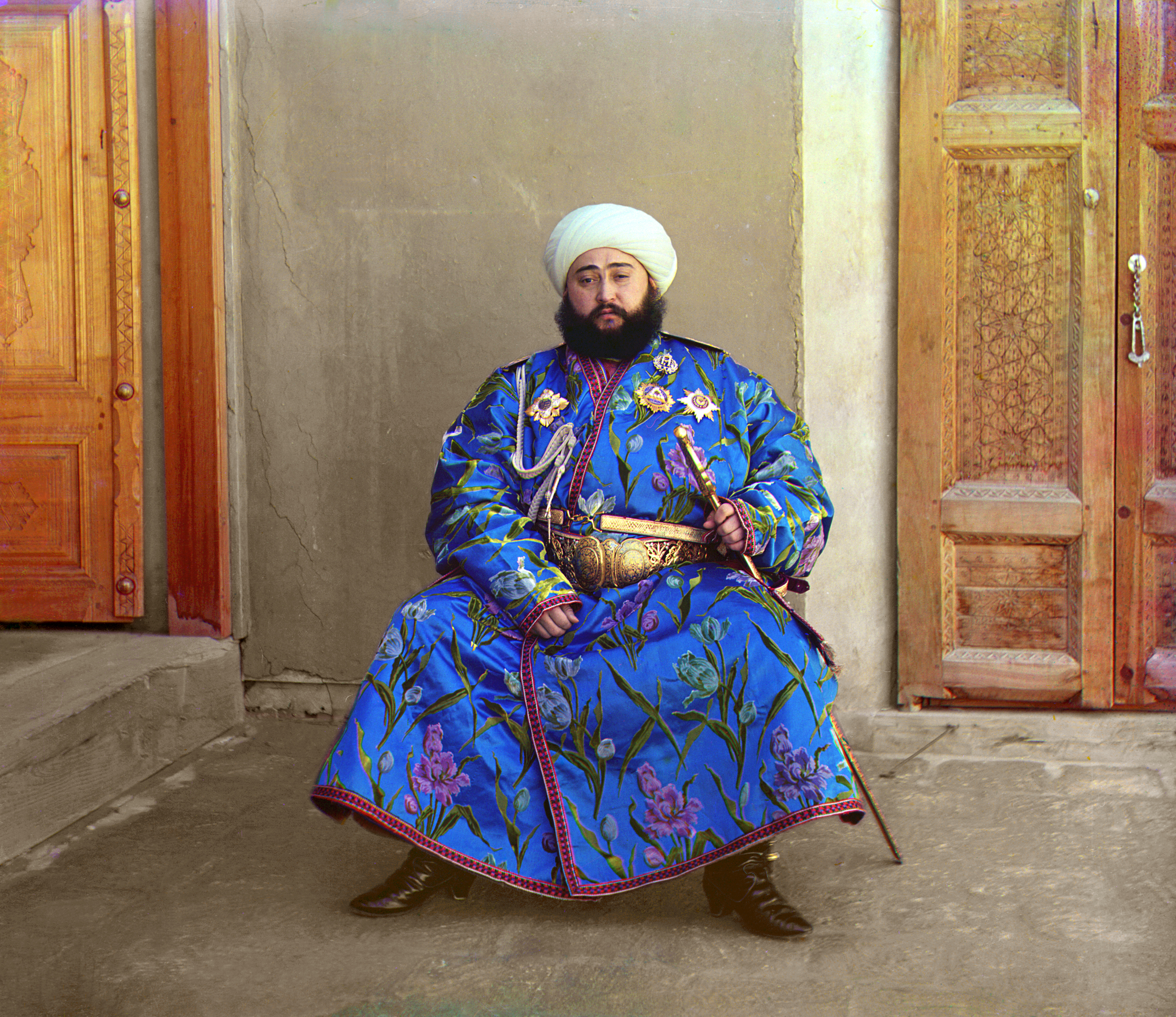
Amir Alim Khan, the last emir of Bukhara, circa 1911, by Sergei Prokudin-Gorskii

Bukhara was the last capital of the Emirate of Bukhara and was besieged by the Red Army during the Russian Civil War. During the Bukhara operation of 1920, Red Army troops under the command of Bolshevik general Mikhail Frunze attacked the city of Bukhara. On 31 August 1920, the Emir Mohammed Alim Khan fled to Dushanbe in Eastern Bukhara (later he escaped from Dushanbe to Kabul in Afghanistan). On 2 September 1920, after four days of fighting, the emir's citadel (the Ark) was destroyed and the red flag was raised from the top of Kalyan Minaret. On 14 September 1920, the All-Bukharan Revolutionary Committee was set up, headed by A. Mukhitdinov. The government—the Council of People's Nazirs (see nāẓir)—was presided over by Fayzulla Xoʻjayev.

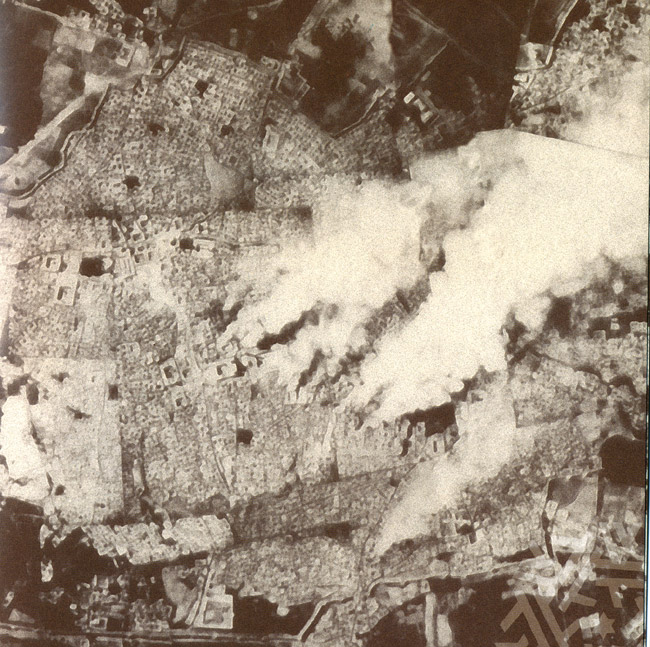
Bukhara under siege by Red Army troops and burning, September 1, 1920

The Bukharan People's Soviet Republic existed from 1920 to 1924 when the city was integrated into the Uzbek Soviet Socialist Republic.

During Enver Pasha's campaign in 1922, majority of Bukhara temporarily fell into the hand of the Basmachis.

Fitzroy Maclean, then a young diplomat in the British Embassy in Moscow, made a surreptitious visit to Bokhara in 1938, sight-seeing and sleeping in parks. In his memoir Eastern Approaches, he judged it an "enchanted city" with buildings that rivalled "the finest architecture of the Italian Renaissance". In the latter half of the 20th century, the war in Afghanistan and civil war in Tajikistan brought Dari- and Tajik-speaking refugees into Bukhara and Samarkand. After integrating themselves into the local Tajik population, these cities face a movement for annexation into Tajikistan with which the cities have no common border.

== Landmarks ==
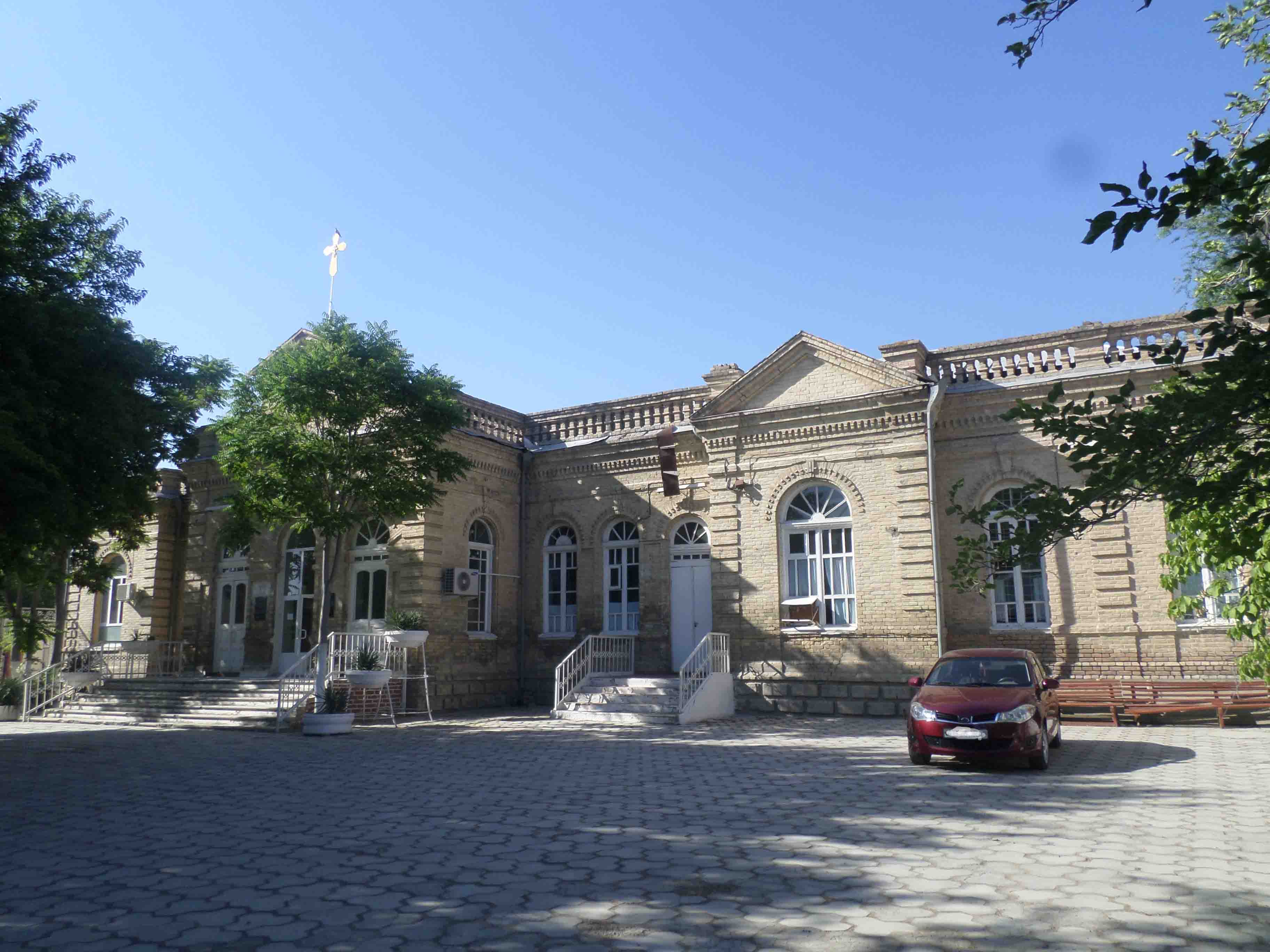
Church of Archangel Michael in Bukhara

=== Architectural complexes ===
- Po-i-Kalyan Complex. The title Po-i Kalan or Poi Kalân (Persian: پای کلان 'Grand Foundation') belongs to the architectural complex located at the base of the great minaret Kalân.
- Kalyan minaret. More properly, Minâra-i Kalân (Persian/Tajik for 'Grand Minaret'). Also known as the Tower of Death, as according to legend it is the site where criminals were executed by being thrown off the top for centuries. The minaret is the most famed part of the ensemble, and dominates over historical center of the city. The role of the minaret is largely for traditional and decorative purposes—its dimension exceeds the bounds of the main function of the minaret, which is to provide a vantage point from which the muezzin can call out people to prayer. For this purpose it was enough to ascend to a roof of a mosque. This practice was common in initial years of Islam. The word minaret derives from the Arabic word منارة manāra ('lighthouse', or more literally 'a place where something burns'). The minarets of the region were possible adaptations of "fire-towers" or lighthouses of previous Zoroastrian eras. The architect, whose name was simply Bako, designed the minaret in the form of a circular-pillar brick tower, narrowing upwards. The diameter of the base is 9 meters (30 feet), while at the top it is 6 m (20 ft). The tower is 45.6 m (150 ft) high, and can be seen from vast distances over the flat plains of Central Asia. There is a brick spiral staircase that twists up inside around the pillar, leading to the landing in sixteen-arched rotunda and skylight, upon which is based a magnificently designed stalactite cornice (or "sharif").
- Kalân Mosque (Masjid-i Kalân), arguably completed in 1514, is equal to the Bibi-Khanym Mosque in Samarkand in size. The mosque is able to accommodate twelve thousand people. Although Kalyan Mosque and Bibi-Khanym Mosque of Samarkand are of the same type of building, they are different in terms of art of building. Two hundred and eighty-eight monumental pylons serve as a support for the multi-domed roofing of the galleries encircling the courtyard of Kalyan Mosque. The longitudinal axis of the courtyard ends up with a portal to the main chamber (maksura) with a cruciform hall, topped with a massive blue cupola on a mosaic drum. The edifice keeps many architectural curiosities, for example, a hole in one of domes. Through this hole one can see foundation of Kalyan Minaret. Then moving back step by step, one can count all belts of brickwork of the minaret to the rotunda.
- Mir-i Arab Madrassah (1535–1536). The construction of Mir-i-Arab Madrasah (Miri Arab Madrasah) is ascribed to Sheikh Abdullah Yamani of Yemen—called Mir-i-Arab—the spiritual mentor of Ubaidullah Khan and his son Abdul-Aziz Khan. Ubaidullah-khan waged permanent successful war with Iran. At least three times his troops seized Herat. Each of such plundering raids on Iran was accompanied by capture of great many captives. They say that Ubaidullah-khan had invested money gained from redemption of more than three thousand Persian captives into construction of Mir-i-Arab Madrasah. Ubaidullah-khan was very religious. He had been nurtured in high respect for Islam in the spirit of Sufism. His father named him in honor of prominent sheikh of the 15th century Ubaidullah al-Ahrar (1404–1490), by origin from Tashkent Region. By the 1530s, when sovereigns erected splendid mausoleums for themselves and for their relatives, was over. Khans of Shaibanid dynasty were standard-bearers of Koran traditions. The significance of religion was so great that even such famed khan as Ubaidullah was conveyed to earth close by his mentor in his madrasah. In the middle of the vault (gurhana) in Mir-i-Arab Madrasah is situated the wooden tomb of Ubaidullah-khan. At his head is wrapped in the moulds his mentor, Mir-i-Arab. Muhammad Kasim, mudarris (a senior teacher) of the madrasah (died in 1047 hijra) is also interred near by here. The portal of Miri Arab Madrasah is situated on one axis with the portal of the Kalyan Mosque. However, because of some lowering of the square to the east it was necessary to raise a little an edifice of the madrasah on a platform.

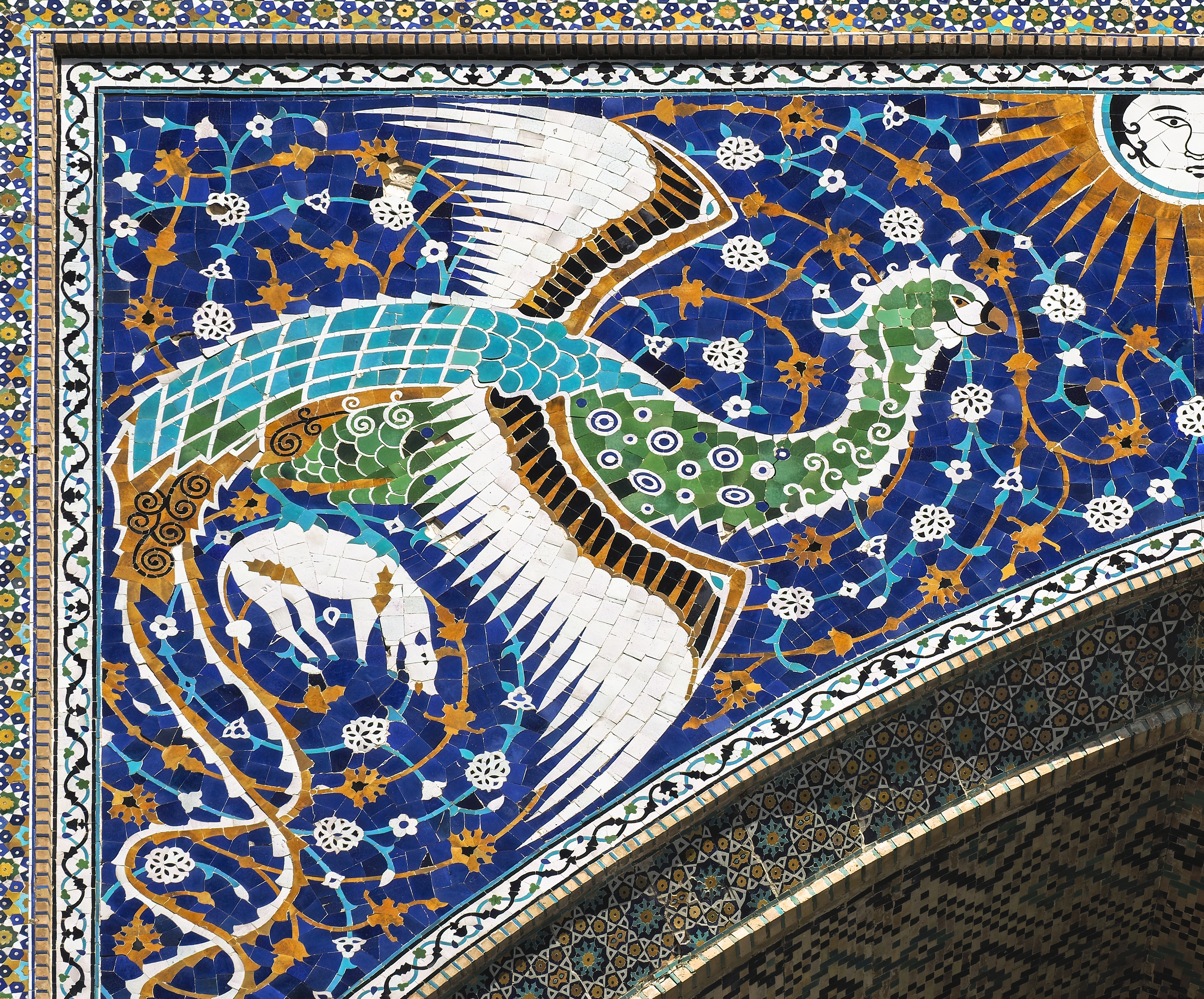
Simurgh on the portal of Nadir Divan-Beghi madrasah (part of Lab-i Hauz complex)

- Lab-i Hauz Complex (or Lab-e hauz, Persian: لب حوض, meaning by the pond) Ensemble (1568–1622) is the name of the area surrounding one of the few remaining hauz, or pond, in the city of Bukhara. Several such ponds existed in Bukhara prior to Soviet rule. The ponds acted as the city's principal source of water, but were also notorious for spreading disease, and thus were mostly filled in during the 1920s and 1930s by the Soviets. The Lab-i Hauz survived owing to its role as the centerpiece of an architectural ensemble dating back to the 16th and 17th centuries. The Lab-i Hauz ensemble consists of the 16th-century Kukeldash Madrasah, the largest in the city, along the north side of the pond. On the eastern and western sides of the pond are a 17th-century lodging-house for itinerant Sufis, and a 17th-century madrasah.

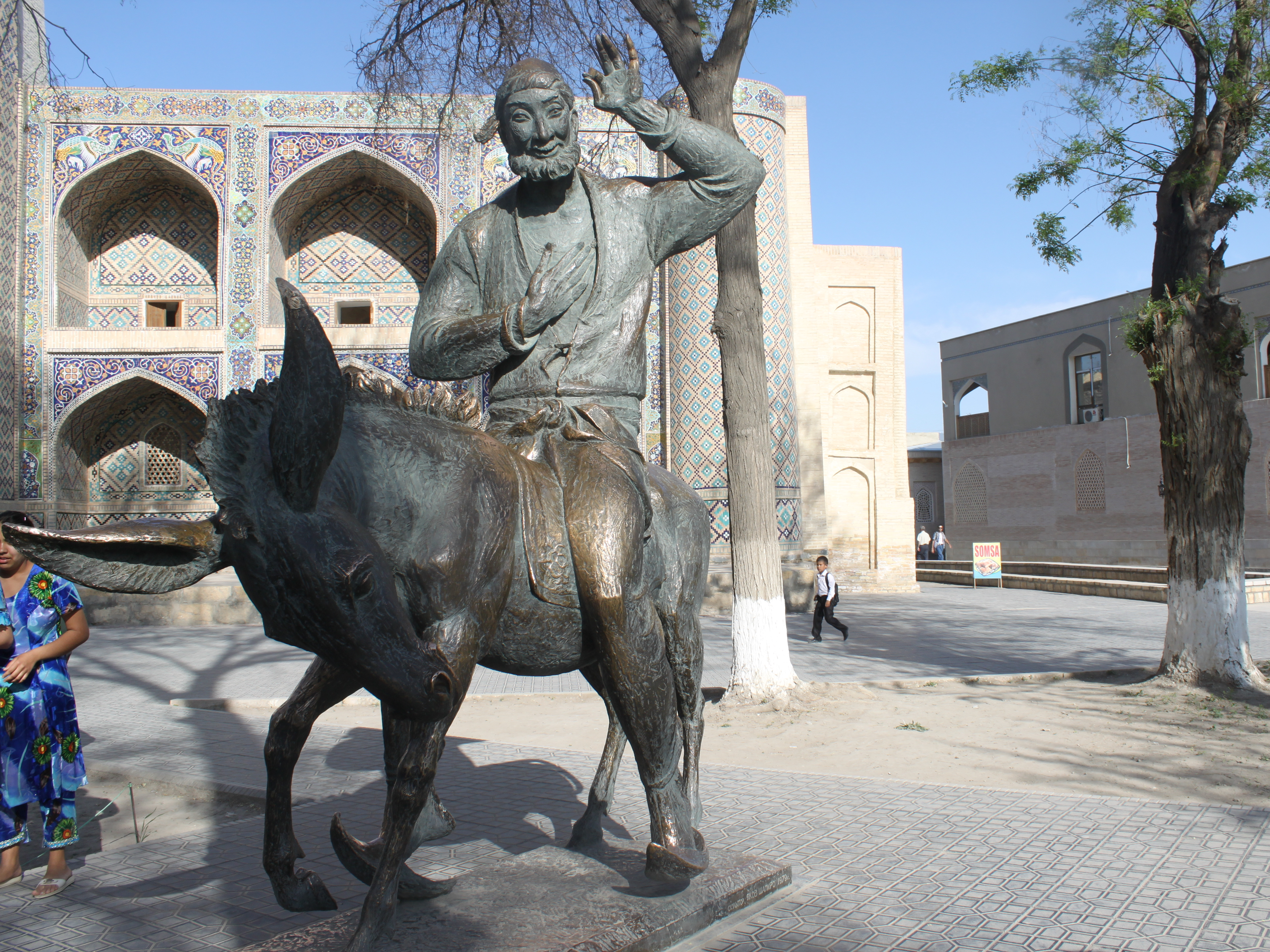
Nasruddin Hodja

There is also a metal sculpture of Nasruddin Hodja, the quick-witted and warm-hearted man, who forms the central character of many children's folk stories in Central Asian, Afghanistan, and Pakistan, sitting atop his mule with one hand on his heart and the other with an 'All OK' sign above his head.

- Bahoutdin Architectural Complex is a necropolis commemorating Shaykh Baha-ud-Din or Bohoutdin, the founder of Naqshbandi order. The complex includes the dahma (gravestone) of Bahoutdin, Khakim Kushbegi mosque, Muzaffarkan mosque, and Abdul-Lazizkhan khanqah. The site is listed on the UNESCO World Heritage Site tentative list on 18 January 2008.

=== Ark and Registan ===
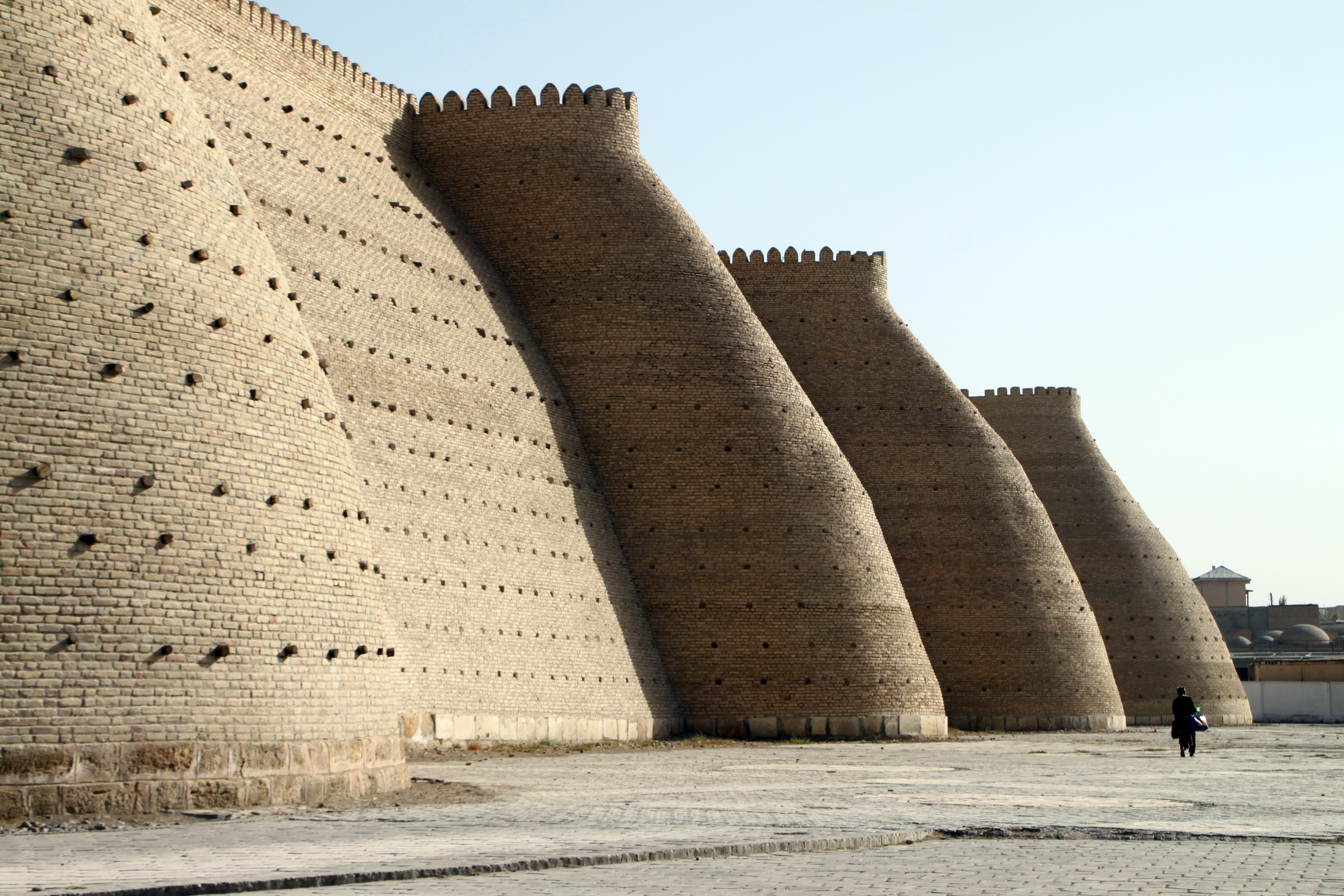
Wall of the Ark of Bukhara

- Ark of Bukhara

The Ark of Bukhara is a massive fortress in the city of Bukhara.

- Registan of Bukhara

The Registan of Bukhara (not to be confused with the one of Samarkand) is a historic public square located at the west of the Ark.

=== Mausoleums ===
- Boboyi Poradoz Mausoleum

The Boboyi Poradoz Mausoleum (Uzbek: Boboyi Poradoʻz maqbarasi) is a monument of architecture in Bukhara Region. The mausoleum was built in the 19th century and is located behind the Salakhona gate. Today the mausoleum is located opposite the Ibn Sina Library of Bukhara. The mausoleum is included in the National List of Objects of Material Cultural Heritage of Uzbekistan of Republican Importance.

- Chashma-Ayub Mausoleum

Chashma-Ayub, or Job's spring, is located near the Samani mausoleum. Its name is said to reflect a legend that states the prophet Job ("Ayub" in the Quran) visited this place and brought forth a spring of water by the blow of his staff on the ground. The water of this well is said to be exceptionally pure, and is regarded for its supposed "healing qualities." The current edifice at the site was constructed during the reign of Timur, and features a Khwarazm-style conical dome that is otherwise uncommon in the region.

- Ismail Samani mausoleum

The Ismail Samani mausoleum (between the 9th and 10th centuries), is one of the most highly esteemed work of Central Asian architecture. It was built in the 9th century (between 892 and 943) as the resting-place of Ismail Samani—the founder of the Samanid dynasty, which was the last native Persian dynasty to rule the region in the 9th to 10th centuries, after the Samanids established virtual independence from the Abbasid Caliphate in Baghdad.

The site is unique for its architectural style which combines both Zoroastrian and Islamic motifs. The building's facade is covered in intricately decorated brick work, which features circular patterns reminiscent of the sun—a common image in Zoroastrian art from the region at that time which is reminiscent of the Zoroastrian god, Ahura Mazda, who is typically represented by fire and light. The building's shape is cuboid, and reminiscent of the Ka'aba in Makkah, while the domed roof is a typical feature of mosque architecture. The syncretic style of the shrine is reflective of the 9th and 10th centuries—a time when the region still had large populations of Zoroastrians who had begun to convert to Islam around that time.

The shrine is also regarded as one of the oldest monuments in the Bukhara region. At the time of Genghis Khan's invasion, the shrine was said to have already been buried in mud from flooding. Thus, when the Mongol hordes reached Bukhara, the shrine was spared from their destruction.

The mausoleum of Pakistan's founding father, Muhammad Ali Jinnah, known as the Mazar-e-Quaid in Karachi, was modeled after the shrine.

=== Mosques ===
- Bolo Haouz Mosque

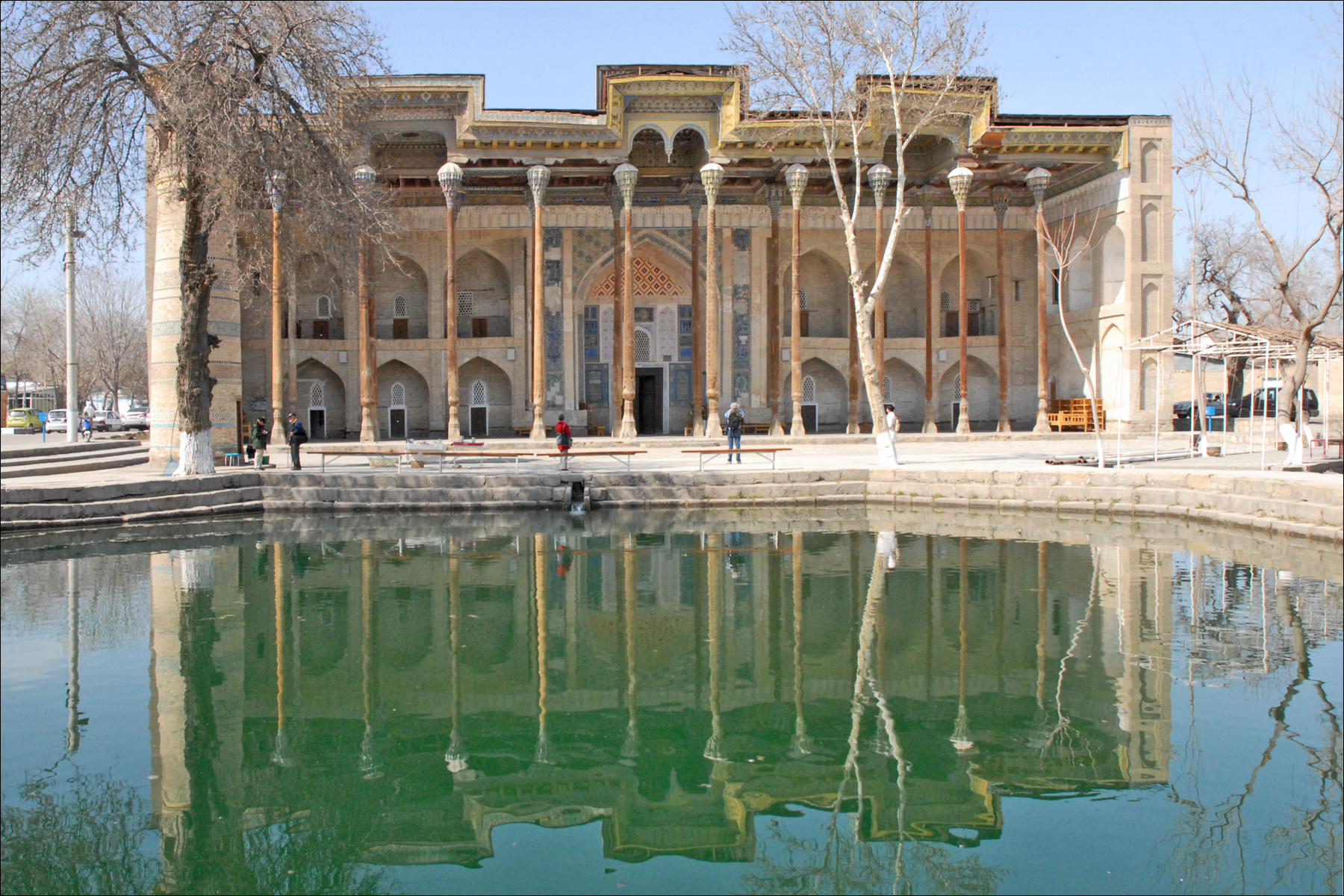
The Bolo Haouz Mosque

Built in 1712, on the opposite side of the citadel of Ark in Registan district, Bolo Haouz Mosque is inscribed in the UNESCO World Heritage Site list, along with the other parts of the historic city. It served as a Friday mosque during the time when the emir of Bukhara was being subjugated under the Bolshevik Russian rule in the 1920s.

- Char Minar

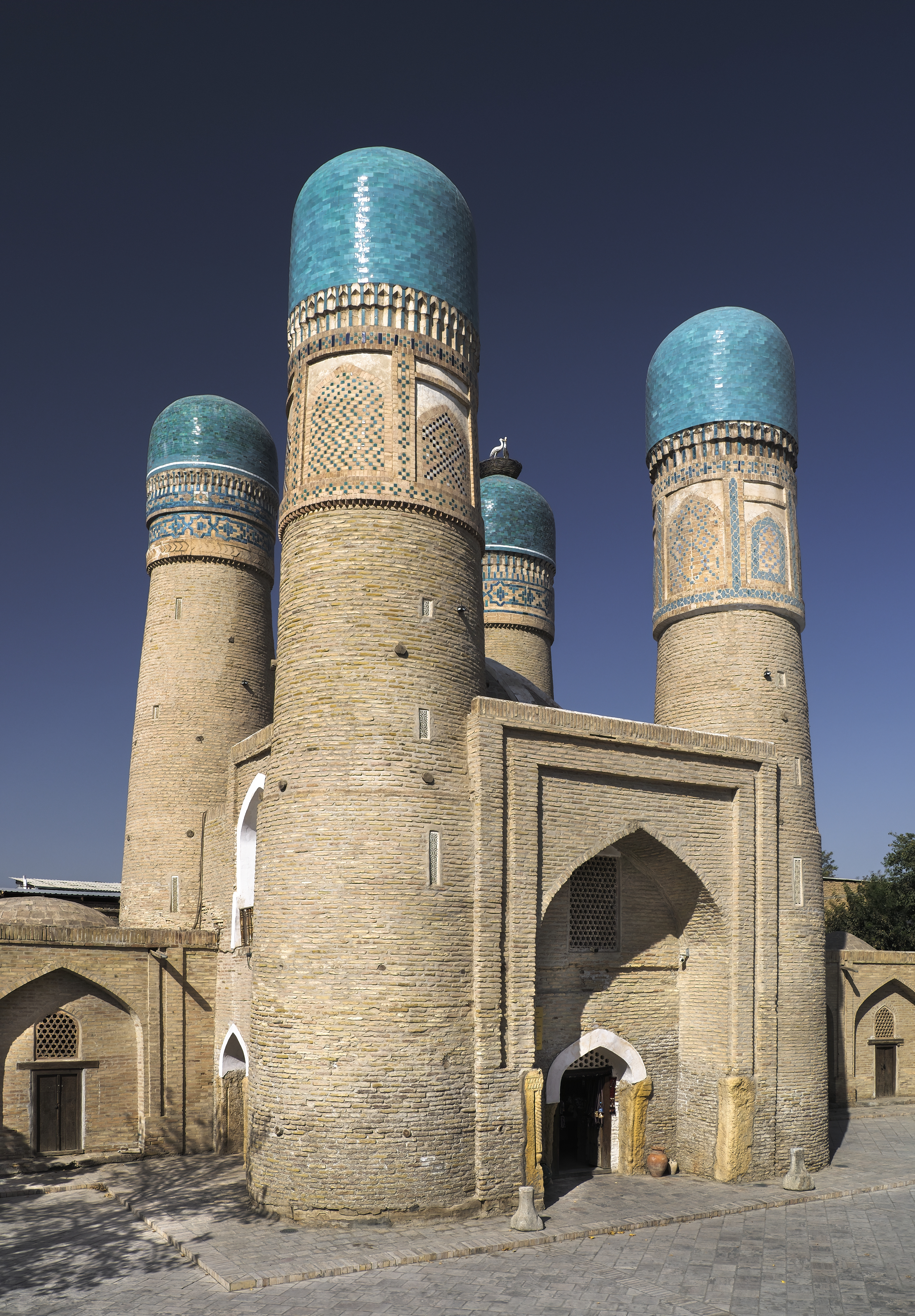
Char Minar

Char Minor (alternatively spelled Chor Minor, and also alternatively known as the Madrasah of Khalif Niyaz-kul) is a building tucked away in a lane northeast of the Lyabi Hauz complex. The structure was built by Khalif Niyaz-kul, a wealthy Bukharan of Turkmen origin in the 19th century under the rule of the Janid dynasty. The four-towered structure is sometimes mistaken for a gate to the madras that once existed behind the structure; however, the Char-Minar is actually a complex of buildings with two functions, ritual and shelter.

The main edifice is a mosque. In spite of its unusual outward shape, the building has a typical interior for a Central Asian mosque. Owing to the buildings cupola, the room has good acoustic properties and therefore takes on special significance of 'dhikr-hana'—a place for ritualized 'dhikr' ceremonies of Sufi, the liturgy of which often include recitation, singing, and instrumental music.

On either side of the central edifice are located dwelling rooms, some of which have collapsed, leaving only their foundations visible. Consequently, for full functioning of madrasah only of classroom and some utility rooms is lacking. However, it was common practice that so-called madrasahs had no lecture rooms or, even if they had, no lectures had been given in them. These madrasahs were employed as student hospices.

Each of the four towers has different decorational motifs. Some say that elements of decoration reflect the four religions known to Central Asians. One can find elements reminiscent of a cross, a Christian fish motif, and a Buddhist praying-wheel, in addition to Zoroastrian and Islamic motifs. In 1995, due to an underground brook, one of the four towers collapsed and emergency assistance was applied for and granted by UNESCO under the World Heritage Fund. Although the collapse resulted in destabilizing the entire structure, the authorities were anxious to keep awareness of the disaster to a minimum. Without explanation the building disappeared from the list of sights and after hurried reconstruction of the tower "using non-traditional building material, such as poor quality cement and steel" Char Minar returned as one of the most popular sights of the city, yet the event has been kept secret ever since.

On the esplanade to the right from Char-Minar is a pool, likely of the same age as the rest of the building complex. Char Minar is now surrounded mainly by small houses and shops along its perimeter.

- Magok-i-Attari Mosque

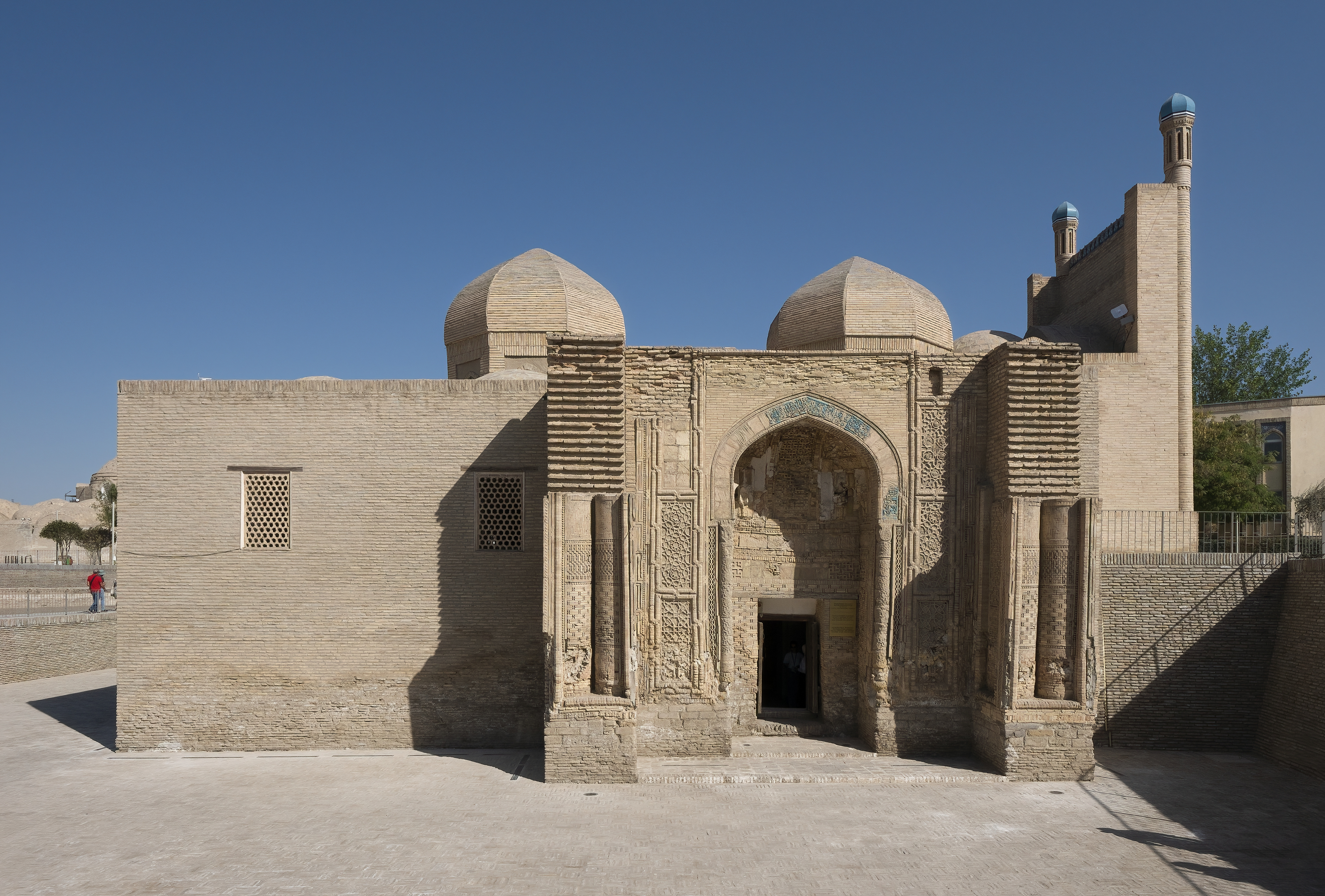
The Magoki-Attari mosque (south façade)

The former Magoki Attori mosque was constructed in the 9th century on the remains of what may have been an older Zoroastrian temple. The mosque was destroyed and rebuilt more than once, and the oldest part now remaining is the south façade, which dates from the 12th century—making it one of the oldest surviving structures in Bukhara, and one of few which survived the onslaught of Genghis Khan. Lower than the surrounding ground level, the mosque was excavated in 1935. It no longer functions as a mosque, but, rather, houses a carpet museum.

- Mosque of Mir Sayyid Ali Hamadani

In Bukhara there is a mosque which is said to be that of Mir Sayyid Ali Hamadani, the patron saint of Kashmiri Muslims in the Valley of Kashmir.

- Shirbudun Palace

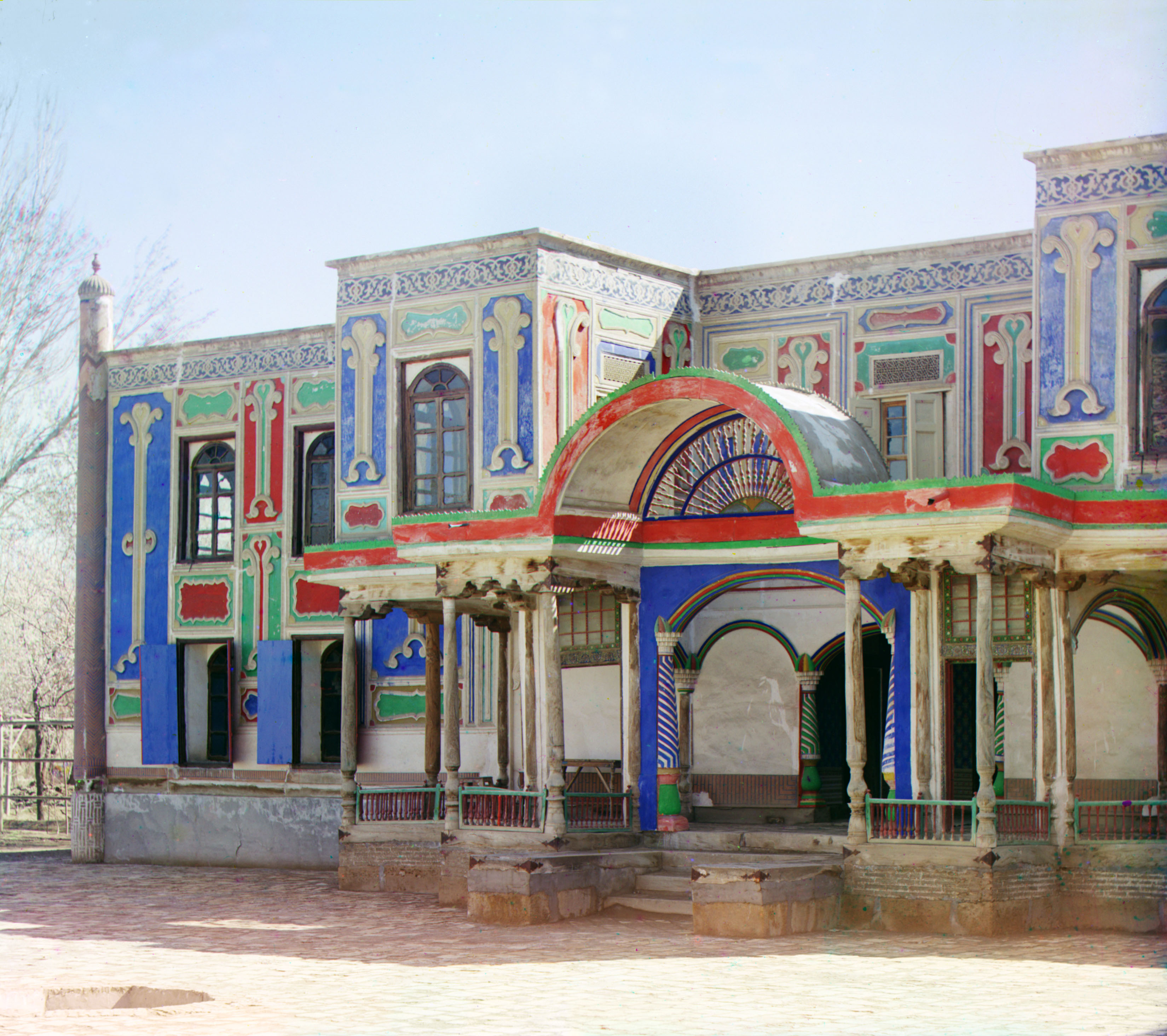
Shirbudun Palace

Shirbudun Palace (Uzbek: Shirbudun saroyi) is one of the Bukhara emirs' political building. The palace's construction started approximately 1870, under the reign of Muzaffar bin Nasrullah (1860–1885) in the Bukhara Emirate.

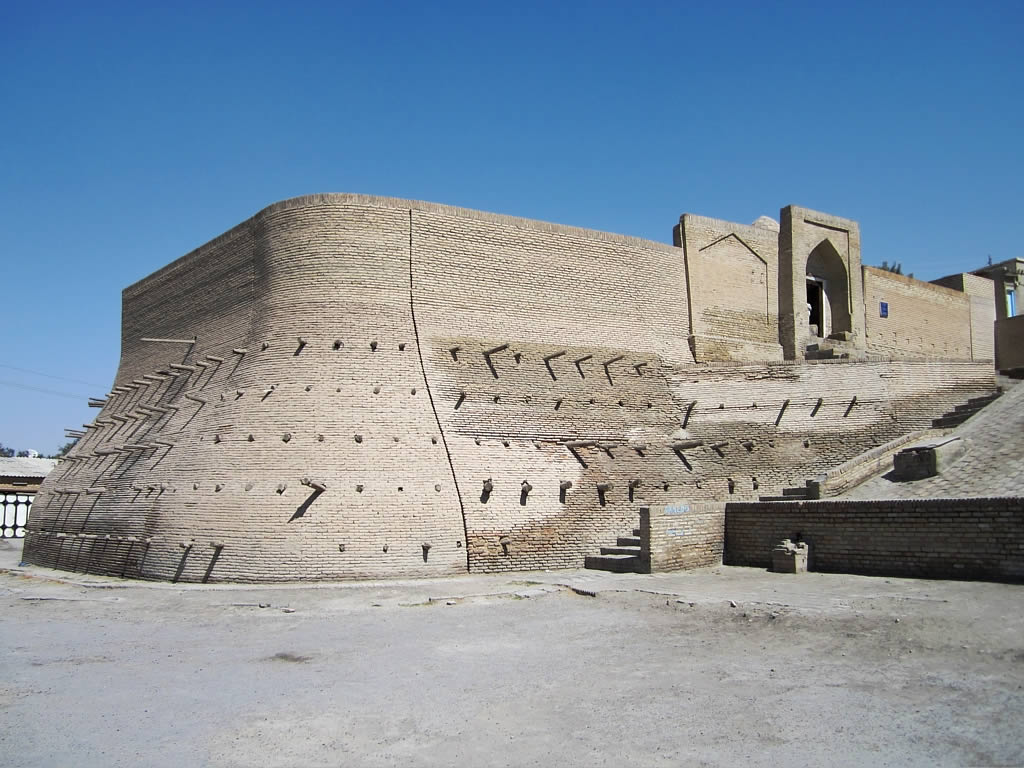
Bukhara Prison

- Bukhara Prison

Bukhara Prison is the prison of the Amir of Bukhara. The prison was built in the second half of the 18th century, during the Mangit dynasty, and is located in the northwest corner of the ancient city, in the vicinity of the Hoja Nizamiddin Bolo burial site, around a hundred meters northeast of the Ark fortress, dating back to the middle centuries.

- Jandi Turki Mausoleum

Jandi Turki Mausoleum is situated on Namozgoh Street, in the old city section of Bukhara. The mausoleum is associated with Abu Nasr Ahmad ibn Fazl ibn Muso al-Muzakkir al-Jandi.

- Khanqah of Nodir Devonbegi

Nodir Devonbegi is a historical memorial in Bukhara, Uzbekistan. It was established by Nodir Devonbegi (Nodir Mirzo Togay ibn Sultan), the vizier and brother of the ruler of Bukhara, Imamquli Khan, around 1620–1621. The Khanaka has been included in the national list of intangible cultural heritage objects of Uzbekistan.

== Geography ==
About 140 miles (230 km) west of Samarkand in south-central Uzbekistan, Bukhara is located on the Zeravshan River, at an elevation of 751 feet (229 meters).

=== Climate ===
Bukhara has a typically Central Asian cool arid climate (Köppen BWk). The average maximum afternoon temperature in January is 6.6 °C or 43.9 °F, rising to an average maximum of around 37.2 °C or 99.0 °F in July. Mean annual precipitation is 135 millimetres or 5.31 inches.

Water was important in the hot, dry climate of Central Asia, so from ancient times, irrigation farming was developed. Cities were built near rivers, and water channels were built to serve the entire city. Uncovered reservoirs, known as hauzes, were constructed. Special covered water reservoirs, or sardobas, were built along caravan routes to supply travelers and their animals with water.

However, the heavy use of agrochemicals during the Soviet era, diversion of irrigation water from the two rivers that feed Uzbekistan, and the lack of water treatment plants have caused health and environmental problems on a large scale.

Climate data for Bukhara (1991–2020, extremes since 2000)
Month	Jan	Feb	Mar	Apr	May	Jun	Jul	Aug	Sep	Oct	Nov	Dec	Year
Record high °C (°F)	22.6 (72.7)	29.6 (85.3)	35.0 (95.0)	38.2 (100.8)	43.0 (109.4)	46.2 (115.2)	45.8 (114.4)	44.6 (112.3)	39.1 (102.4)	37.8 (100.0)	31.7 (89.1)	26.1 (79.0)	46.2 (115.2)
Mean daily maximum °C (°F)	7.0 (44.6)	10.0 (50.0)	17.1 (62.8)	24.4 (75.9)	30.7 (87.3)	36.0 (96.8)	37.3 (99.1)	35.6 (96.1)	30.0 (86.0)	22.9 (73.2)	14.5 (58.1)	8.2 (46.8)	22.8 (73.0)
Daily mean °C (°F)	1.8 (35.2)	4.1 (39.4)	10.3 (50.5)	17.2 (63.0)	23.4 (74.1)	28.4 (83.1)	29.8 (85.6)	27.6 (81.7)	21.7 (71.1)	14.6 (58.3)	7.6 (45.7)	2.8 (37.0)	15.8 (60.4)
Mean daily minimum °C (°F)	−2.2 (28.0)	−0.4 (31.3)	4.7 (40.5)	10.5 (50.9)	15.6 (60.1)	19.9 (67.8)	21.6 (70.9)	19.4 (66.9)	13.6 (56.5)	7.4 (45.3)	2.2 (36.0)	−1.2 (29.8)	9.3 (48.7)
Record low °C (°F)	−23.5 (−10.3)	−18.1 (−0.6)	−8.2 (17.2)	0.0 (32.0)	1.3 (34.3)	9.8 (49.6)	14.7 (58.5)	10.3 (50.5)	1.6 (34.9)	−3.3 (26.1)	−14.0 (6.8)	−16.5 (2.3)	−23.5 (−10.3)
Average precipitation mm (inches)	16.5 (0.65)	24.1 (0.95)	25.1 (0.99)	22.3 (0.88)	11.1 (0.44)	1.8 (0.07)	0.4 (0.02)	0.3 (0.01)	0.8 (0.03)	2.7 (0.11)	14.5 (0.57)	12.8 (0.50)	132.4 (5.21)
Average precipitation days (≥ 1.0 mm)	10	10	10	8	7	3	1	1	1	4	8	9	72
Average snowy days	3.38	2.33	0.63	0.04	0	0	0	0	0	0.04	0.71	2.54	9.67
Average relative humidity (%)	80	75	72	59	46	38	40	44	48	56	64	79	58
Source 1: NOAA
Source 2: Deutscher Wetterdienst (humidity), Meteomanz(snowy days 2000-2023 and records)

== Transportation ==
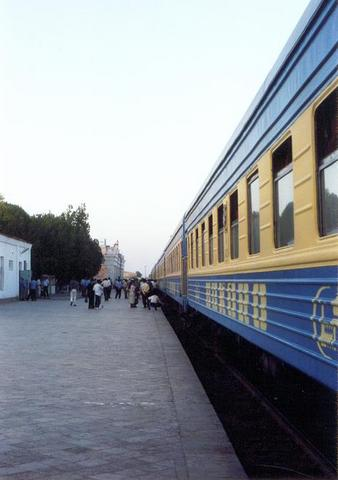
Bukhara train station

Bukhara International Airport has regularly scheduled flights to cities in Uzbekistan, Russia and Turkey. The Turkmenistan border is about 80 km away with the nearest city there being Türkmenabat, connected via the M37 highway which continues to other places in Turkmenistan including Ashgabat. The city is also served by railroad links with the rest of Uzbekistan, and is a hub for roadways leading to all major cities in Uzbekistan and beyond, including Mazar-i-Sharif in Afghanistan via the M39 highway. The city of Samarkand is 215 km to the east of Bukhara.

=== Internal transportation facilities ===
Bukhara city is the largest transport hub after Tashkent in Uzbekistan. Inside the city there is facility of bus transportation. There are over 45 bus lines. Majority of them have been equipped with ISUZU buses but some buses are being brought from China. By the number of buses and bus routes facilities Bukhara is the largest after Tashkent in Uzbekistan.

== Demographics ==
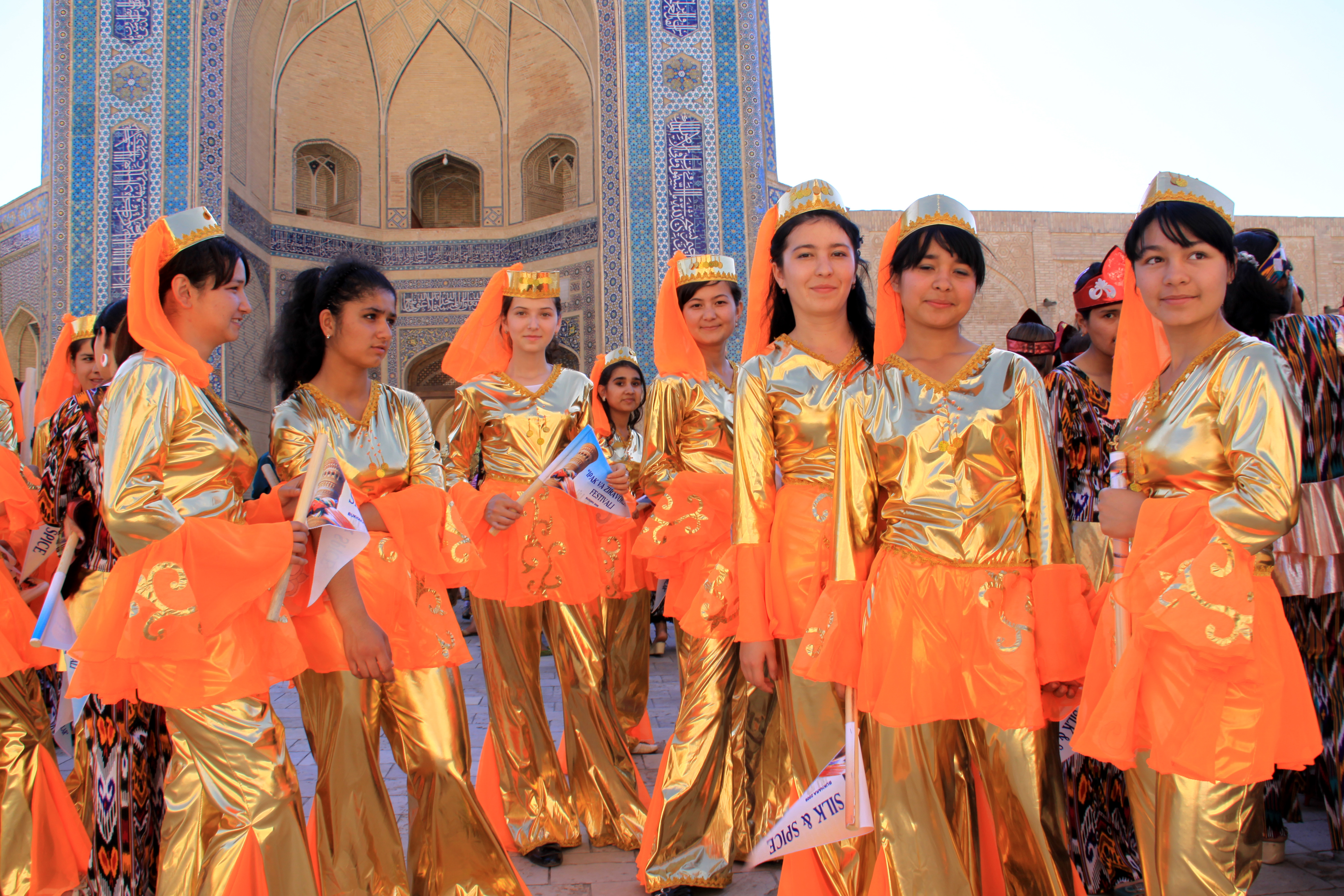
Uzbekistan, Bukhara, Spices and silk festival

Bukhara recorded a population of 279,200 in 2019. Bukhara (along with Samarkand) is one of the two major centers of Uzbekistan's Tajik minority. Bukhara was also home to the Bukharan Jews, whose ancestors settled in the city during Roman times. Most Bukharian Jews left Bukhara between 1925 and 2000.

Ali-Akbar Dehkhoda defines the name Bukhara itself as meaning "full of knowledge", referring to the fact that in antiquity, Bukhara was a scientific and scholarship powerhouse. In the Italian romantic epic Orlando innamorato by Matteo Maria Boiardo, Bukhara is called Albracca and described as a major city of Cathay. There, within its walled city and fortress, Angelica and the knights she has befriended make their stand when attacked by Agrican, emperor of Tartary. As described, this siege by Agrican resembles the historic siege by Genghis Khan in 1220.

=== Ethnic groups ===
According to the official statistics, the city's population is 82% Uzbeks, 6% Russians, 4% Tajiks, 2% Tatars, 1% Koreans, 1% Turkmens, 1% Kurds, 1% Ukrainians, 2% of other ethnicities. However, official Uzbek numbers have for long been criticized and refuted by various observers and Western sources and it is widely assumed that the population of the city consists mainly of Tajik-speaking Tajiks, with ethnic Uzbeks forming a growing minority. Exact figures are difficult to evaluate, since many people in Uzbekistan either identify as "Uzbek" even though they speak Tajik as their first language, or because they are registered as Uzbeks by the central government despite their Tajik language and identity. According to Soviet estimates in the early 20th century (based on numbers from 1913 and 1917), the Tajiks formed the overwhelming majority of city.

=== Religion ===
Islam is the majority religion. But there are also Christian and other minorities.

== Notable people ==
Many notable people lived in Bukhara in the past. Among them are:

- Tughshada was Bukhar Khudah (king of Bukhara) from 681 to 739.
- An Lushan (c. 703–757)
- Muhammad Ibn Ismail Ibn Ibrahim Ibn al-Mughirah Ibn Bardizbah al-Bukhari (810–870) – Islamic scholar and compiler of hadiths
- Avicenna (Abu Ali ibn Sina) (980–1037) – Persian physician and philosopher
- Qumri (fl. Mind 10th Century d. approx. 980–990)—physician and scholar, purported to be Avicenna's teacher
- Bal'ami: Abolfazl Muhammad and his son Abu-Ali Mohammad, two famous Persian viziers of Samanid kings, historians and patrons of art and literature
- Abubakr Narshakhi (10th century) – historian who wrote History of Bukhara
- Sadiduddin Mohammad Aufi (1171–1242) historian, scientist, and author.
- Syed Jalaluddin Surkh-Posh Bukhari (c. 595–690 AH, 1199–1291 CE)
- Sayyid Ajjal Shams al-Din Omar (1211–1279)
- Baha-ud-Din Naqshband Bukhari (1318–1389)
- Amir Kulal (died in 1370)
- Sadriddin Ayni (1878–1954)
- Abdurauf Fitrat (1886–1938)
- Fayzulla Xoʻjayev (1896–1938)
- Ibraghim Muminov (1908–1974)
- Sorojon Yusufova (1910–1966)
- Muhammadjon Shakuri (1925–2012)
- Yitzhak Apeloig (1944-2026), Israeli computational chemistry professor and President of the Technion
- Bakhrom Khamroyev, lawyer, human rights defender, sentenced to 14 years in Russia
- Oksana Chusovitina - 8 time Olympic gymnast (born 1975)
- Ilgiz Tantashev (born 1984), FIFA football referee
- Yulduz Turdiyeva (born 1985), Uzbek singer

== International relations ==
The following is a list of Bukhara's sister cities:

- Bonn, Germany (1999)
- Córdoba, Spain (1983)
- Hamadan, Iran
- Khujand, Tajikistan
- Lahore, Pakistan (1995)
- Malatya, Turkey
- Nishapur, Iran
- Rueil-Malmaison, France (1999)
- Santa Fe, United States (1988)

== See also ==
- Bukhara rug
- List of World Heritage Sites in Uzbekistan
- Zaynab Sultan Khonim Mausoleum
