= Sorojon Yusufova =

Tajik geologist and academician of the Academy of Sciences of the Tajik SSR

Sorojon Mikhailovna Yusufova
- Born: 5 May 1910; Bukhara, Emirate of Bukhara, Imperial Russia
- Died: 15 May 1966 (aged 56); Dushanbe, Tajik SSR, Soviet Union
- Education: Samarkand State University; Academy of Sciences of the USSR
- Occupation: Geologist
- Awards: Order of the Badge of Honor

Sorojon Mikhailovna Yusufova (Tajik: Сороҷон Михайловна Юсуфова) (5 May 1910 – 15 May 1966) was a Tajik geologist and academician of the Soviet era.

== Biography ==
Born in Bukhara, Emirate of Bukhara, Russian Empire the daughter of Bukharan Jews, Yusufova graduated from Samarkand State University in 1935. She continued her postgraduate study at the Soil Institute of the Academy of Sciences of the USSR in the Uzbek Soviet Socialist Republic (SSR).

In 1940 Yusufova began working at the Institute of Geology at the outpost of the Academy of Sciences and she continued in this position for three years. In 1946 she moved to the Institute of Geology at the SSR's branch of the Academy of Sciences of Tajikistan, remaining there until 1948 and, after completing her doctoral studies in geology and mineralogy, she was named head of geologic studies related to coal and oil.

Simultaneously, beginning in 1940 and continuing until her death, she worked in the Department of Mineralogy and Petrography of Tajik National University, where she became the first to lead the department when she was appointed to the post in 1948. Her main research interests were the geochemistry of Celestine, the Tajik mineral springs and the Central Asian loess soils. She was the first person in Tajikistan to study the geochemistry of thermal springs.

Yusufova was appointed a professor in 1950 and taught at the universities of Dushanbe, Tajikistan as well as Tashkent, Uzbekistan. Her main sphere of research included the mineral properties, elemental composition and geochemistry of mineralogy of sedimentary rocks, such as clay and loam. In 1951 she was elected a full member of the Academy of Sciences of the Tajik SSR.

In 1962 she became a member of the Communist Party of the Soviet Union.

She gave a detailed geochemical and mineralogical analysis of clay minerals in her textbook, published in 1964 (the first text published in the Tajik language).

Studying the loess of Tajikistan, I came to the conclusion about their alluvial origins, collected extensive material about their mineralogical composition, moisture capacity and subsidence properties, which was the basis for the conclusion about the engineering-geological features of loess rocks.

She died 15 May 1966 in Dushanbe, the capital of Tajikistan.

== Honors ==
- Yusufova was a member of the Supreme Soviet of the Tajik SSR
- She was awarded the Order of the Badge of Honor and medals of the USSR.
- In 1960, she was named a Distinguished Contributor to Science in Tajikistan.
- The mining and geology technical center in Dushanbe bears Yusufova's name.

== Selected publications ==
Yusufova authored the first textbook to be published in the Tajik language "Geology with elements of mineralogy and petrography" (1964).

Among her writings are Mineralogical Peculiarities of Central Asia's Yellow Dust (Moscow, 1951) and Mineralogical Peculiarities of the Loess in the Vakhsh Valley (1985).
