= Yulduz Turdiyeva =

Uzbek singer

- Born: Yulduz Turdiyeva; August 10, 1985 (age 40)
- Origin: Bukhara, Uzbek SSR, USSR
- Genres: Mugham; Uzbek music
- Occupation: Singer
- Label: RizaNova.UZ

Yulduz Turdiyeva (Uzbek: Yulduz Turdiyeva; Russian: Юлдуз Турдиева) is an Uzbek singer who sings in Uzbek, Azeri and Persian. She is an honored artist of Uzbekistan. Her music is characterized by her vocal improvisation.

== Life ==
Yulduz Turdiyeva was born on August 10, 1985, in Bukhara region. In 2008, she graduated from the Uzbekistan State Conservatory. Married in 2007 and now has 3 children. The first music album of the singer, who won the 2010 "Nihol" award, was released in 2011. In addition, in 2004, she won the "Best Vocalist" award at the "Fifth International Youth Festival" held in Yalta, and the first prize at the International Mugam Festival held in Azerbaijan in 2009. Honored Artist of Uzbekistan. She is of half Uzbek and Azerbaijani origin.

== Career ==
In 2009, she won first place at International World of Mugham Festival after performing Karabakh Shikastasi, fret of Azerbaijani mugham.

== Discography ==
- Ona men keldim degin
- Yulduz Turdiyeva and Otabek Yusupov — Rashkim yomon
- Shamol
- Kelma
- Libli Umriya
- Dilbaram Dilbar
- Muhabbat
- Oʻzgancha tanovar
- Ishq Ayladi
- Nahori Nashta
- Fargʻona tong otguncha
- Chaman
- Bogʻimbor
- Kelgin Bahorim
- Yomgʻir
- Qoshlariqaro
- Istayiram Guramsani
- Qoʻymaslar
- Naylayin
- Bolajonlar
- Qaydabor
- Taramgʻi
- Yolgʻizimsan
- Shukrona
- Navoderlar
- Ketaveryorim
- Vatan
- Dardu dilingman
