= Bukhara Prison =

Former prison, now a museum, in Bukhara, Uzbekistan

- Buxoro zindoni (Uzbek)
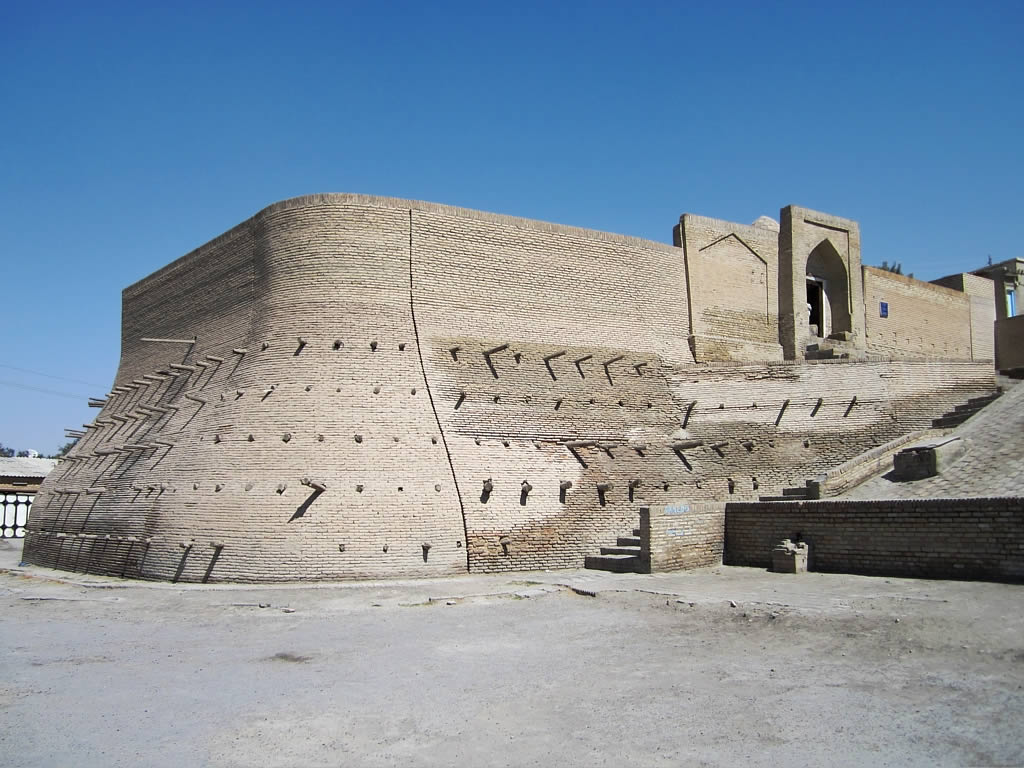
- Bukhara prison
- Interactive map of Bukhara Prison
- 39°46′44″N 64°24′50″E
- Location: Bukhara, Uzbekistan
- Nearest city: Bukhara

History
- Built for: Prison

Site notes
- Current use: Museum

Bukhara Prison is a fortified building that traditionally served as the prison of the Amir of Bukhara, in Uzbekistan. In the late 18th century, during the reign of the Mangits, it was built and was one of the largest prisons of the Bukhara Emirate. After the Bukhara Revolution, the collapse of the monarchy, and the formation of the Bukhara People's Soviet Republic, it was closed. Currently, it is considered a historic site and houses the Museum of Legal and Judicial History of Bukhara.

== History ==
The prison was built in the 2nd half of the 18th century, during the Mangit dynasty, and is located in the northwest corner of the ancient city, in the vicinity of the Hoja Nizamiddin Bolo burial site, around a hundred meters northeast of the Ark fortress, dating back to the middle centuries.

== Architecture ==
The prison is surrounded by a solid wall, and above it a high adobe structure with walls reinforced by buttresses. The entrance to the prison is through a small arched wooden door. The prison is divided into two parts: the upper prison called "zindon-i bolo" and the lower prison called "zindon-i poyon". The first part consists of several rooms for prisoners. Every month, the inmates were subjected to public flogging and suspended from a pole with chains. The second part is a deep pit with a diameter of 5 meters and a depth of 6.5 meters, surrounded by a high wall topped with battlements. These pits were used for prisoners convicted of serious crimes including high-ranking officials who had fallen into disgrace.

Most of the inmates at this prison were rebels, murderers, thieves, bandits, debtors (if the death penalty was not imposed on them), those awaiting execution (if the death penalty had not yet been carried out), and conspirators awaiting trial. In the courtyard are adobe buildings from different periods. These include the prison guard's room, tax collectors' quarters, debtors' rooms, and cells for political prisoners as well as those condemned to death. Bukhara Prison is included in the UNESCO World Heritage List as part of the overall heritage of Uzbekistan. In 2020, some episodes of the film about Behbudiy were shot in the prison.

== Gallery ==
Gallery

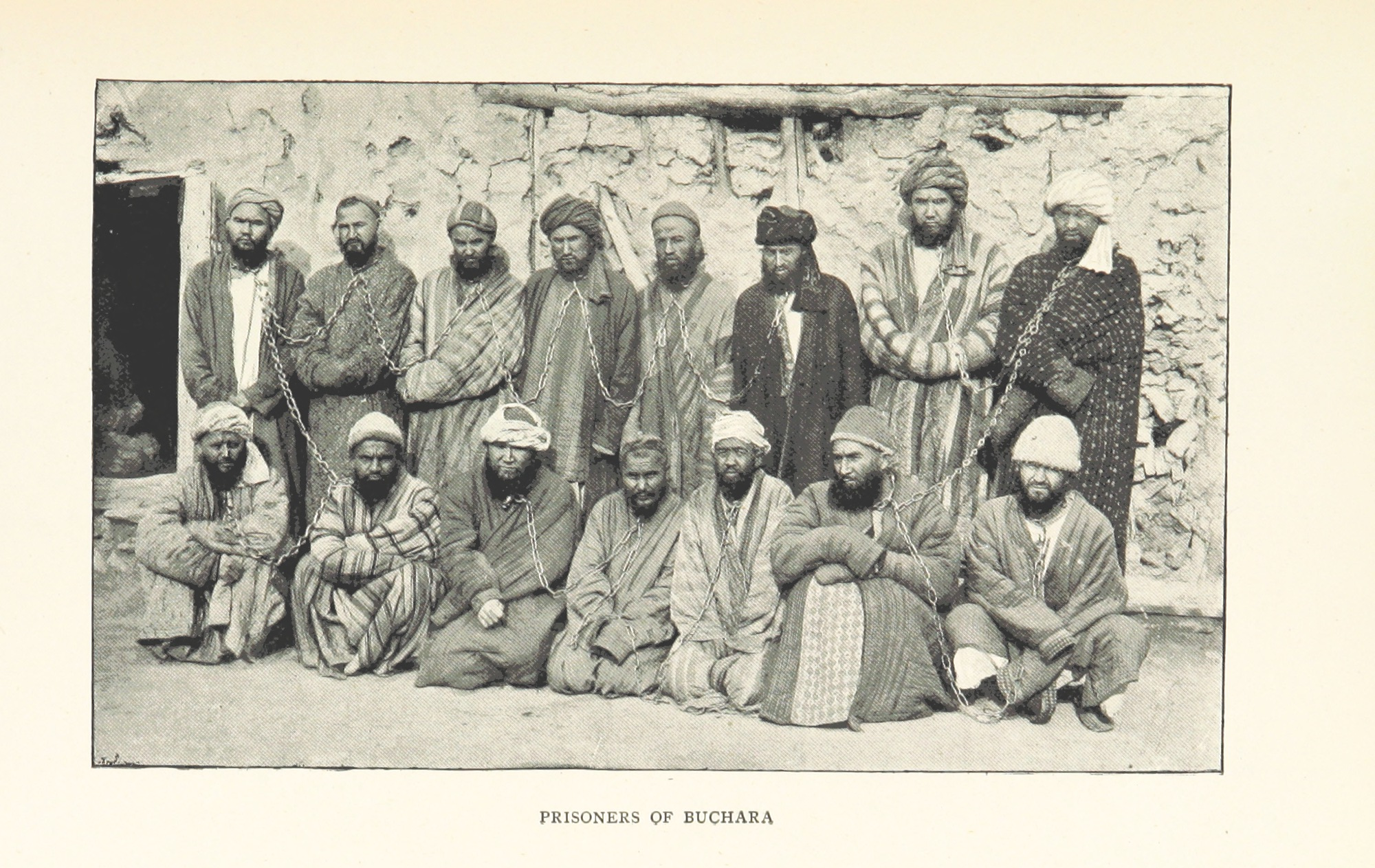
A group of prisoners in Bukhara, 1899

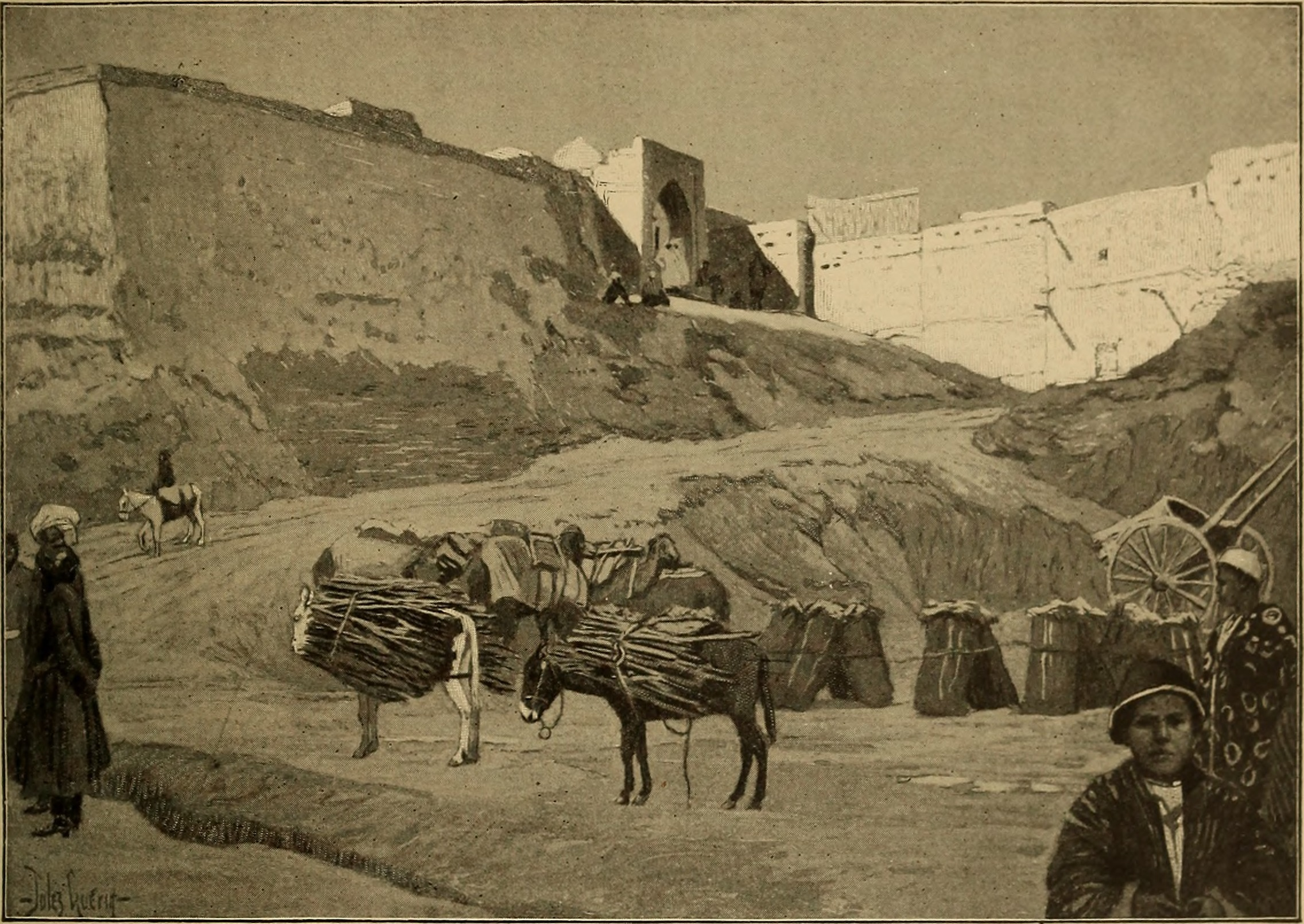
Bukhara prison, 1902

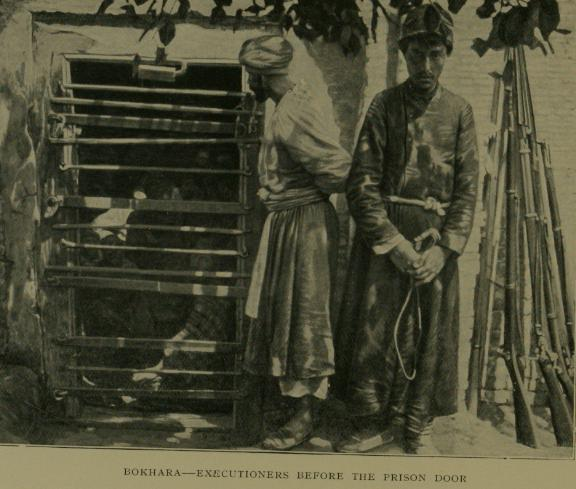
Executioners at the door of Bukhara prison, 1909

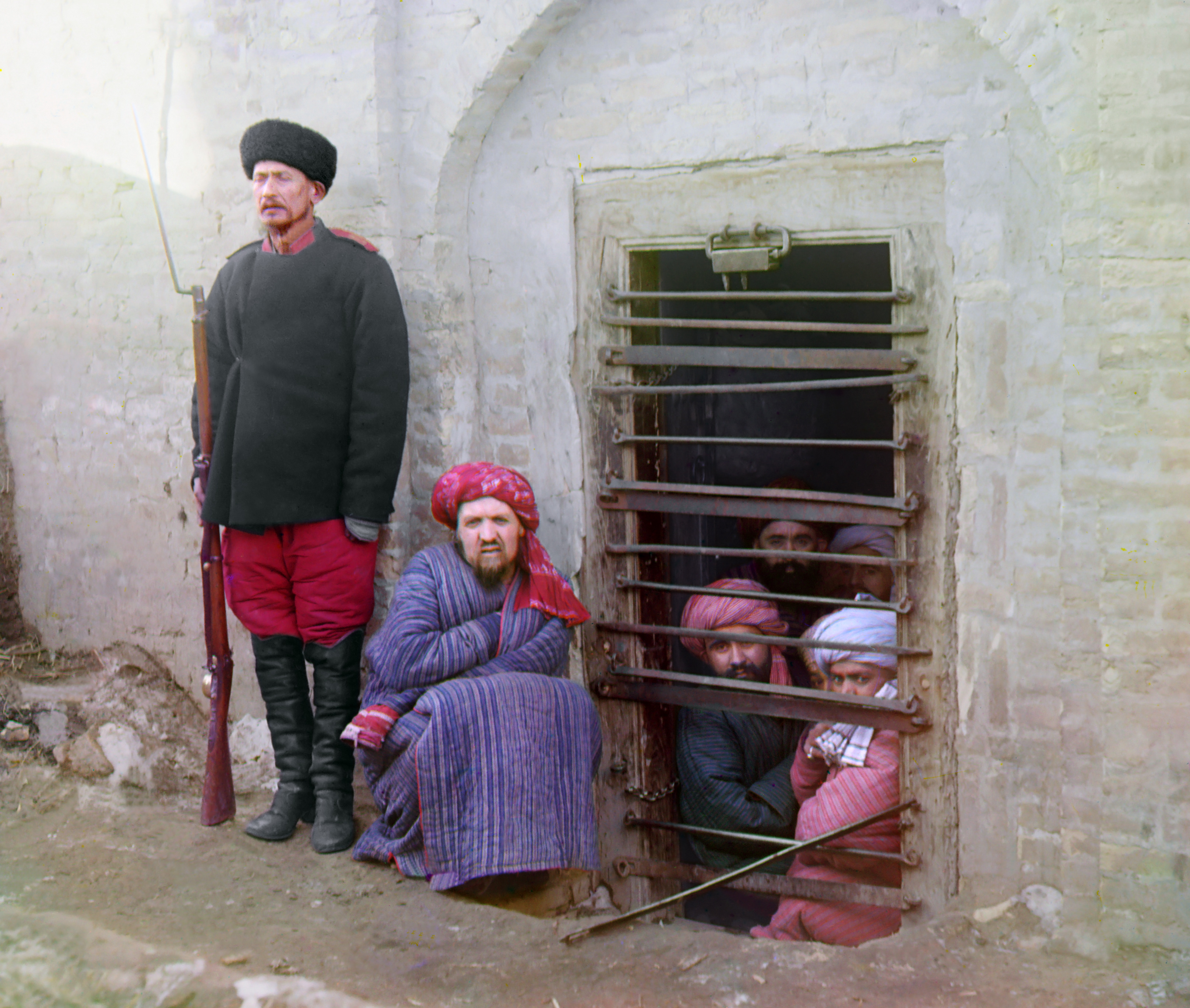
Bukhara. Photo of S. M. Prokudin-Gorsky, 1915

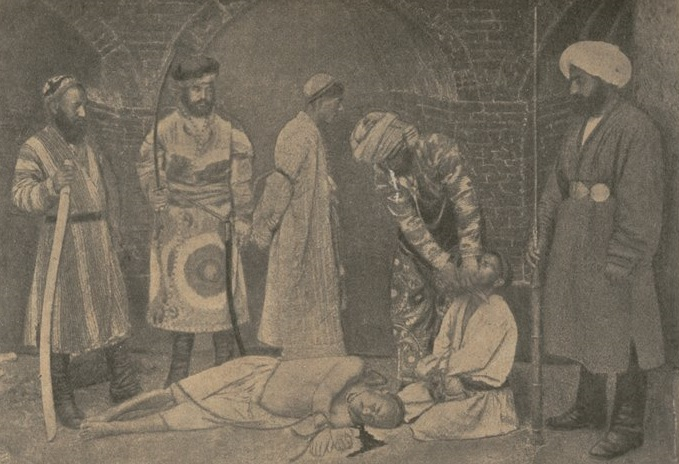
The process of beheading those sentenced to death in Bukhara, 1913

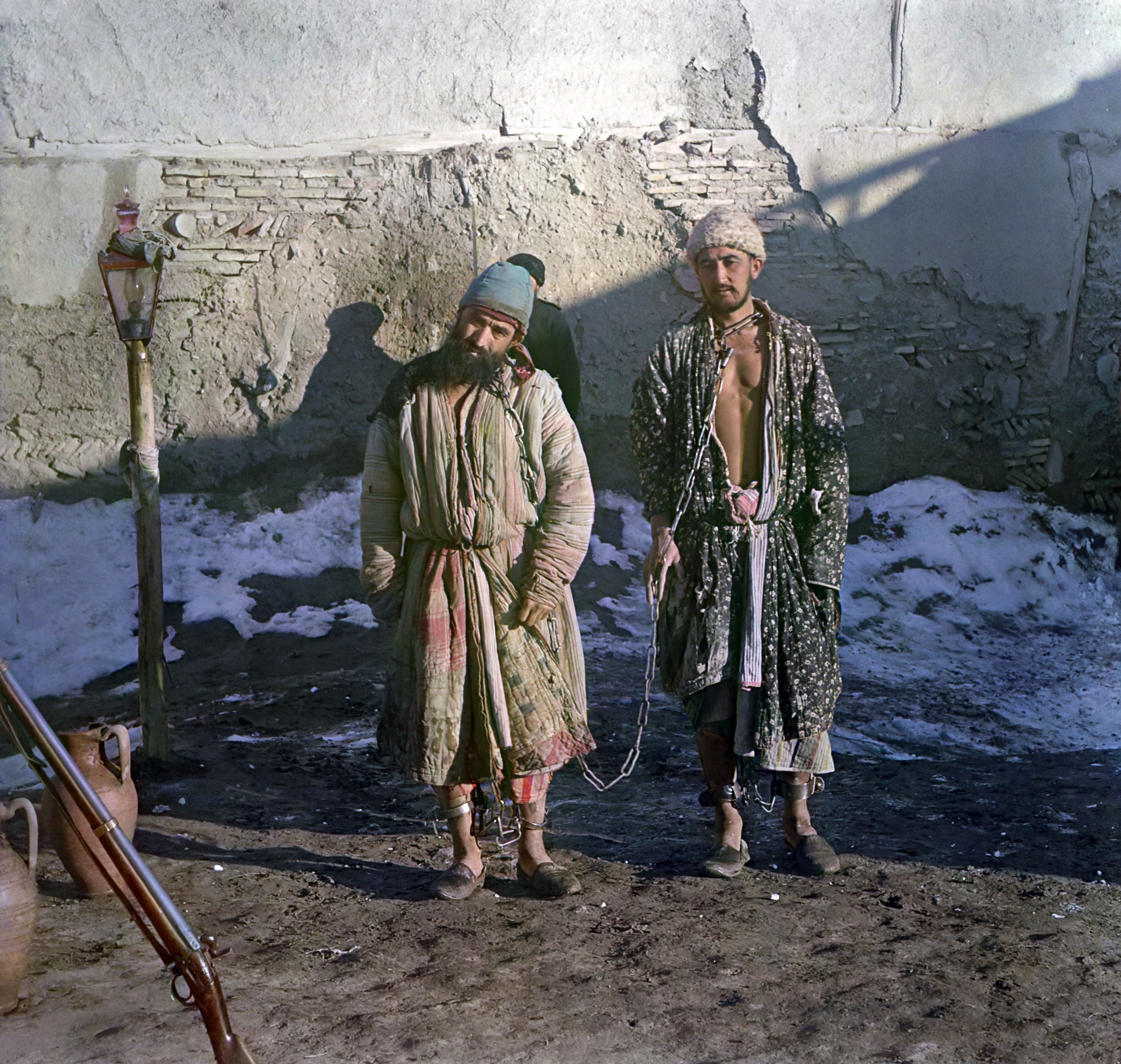
Prisoners in Bukhara.
