= Boboyi Poradoz Mausoleum =

- Boboyi Poradoʻz maqbarasi
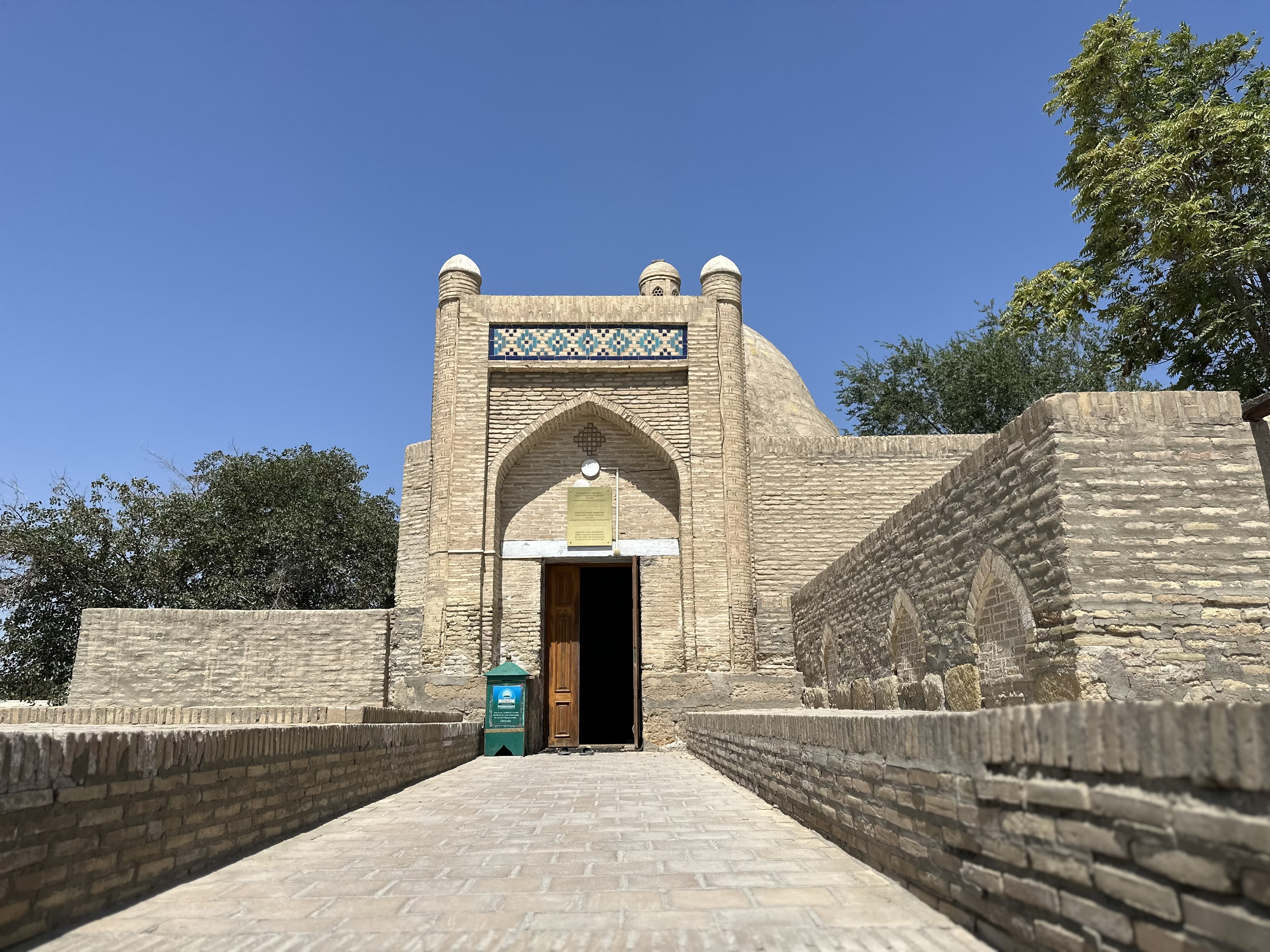
- Entrance of Boboyi Poradoz Mausoleum
- Interactive map of the Boboyi Poradoz Mausoleum area

General information
- Architectural style: Central Asian
- Location: Bukhara, Uzbekistan
- Coordinates: 39°45′56″N 64°25′08″E
- Year built: 19th century
- Renovated: 1990s

Technical details
- Material: Brick, wood, stone and ganch

The Boboyi Poradoz Mausoleum (Uzbek: Boboyi Poradoʻz maqbarasi) is a monument of architecture in Bukhara, Uzbekistan. The mausoleum was built in the 19th century and is located behind the Salakhona gate. Today the mausoleum is located opposite the Ibn Sina Library of Bukhara. The mausoleum is included in the National List of Objects of Material Cultural Heritage of Uzbekistan of Republican Importance.

== History ==
The mausoleum of Hazrat Boboyi Poradoz is located in the southeast part of Bukhara, near the city gate of Salakhona. Here, in the early 20th century, there was a mazar with a complex of architectural structures (mausoleums, mosques, rooms for pilgrims, residential houses, wells). Now only the center of the mausoleum remains, where Boboyi Poradoz was once buried, and in his honor the whole mazar was named. Boboyi Poradoz was a scholar and sheikh, born in Bukhara in 842 and died in 925. His profession was patchwork sewing and shoemaking, so he is also considered a contemporary of shoemakers. He was considered the patron of all craftsmen who dealt with needles: shoemakers, tailors, gold embroiderers. His name in Persian means “grandfather who patched up”, and there are many legends associated with this name, one of them tells about a man who tried to make a pilgrimage to Mecca, asking Boboyi Poradoz to sew him a sturdy shoe for the road, the master made it from watermelon peel, but convinced the pilgrim of the durability of the product. After several years of travel, the pilgrim returned in shoes that had not lost their original appearance. Since then, the fame of Boboyi Poradoz as a skilled master spread throughout the district, and the masters unanimously chose him as their pir (head).

According to another legend, if “the ashes of the Mazar of Boboyi Poradoz are sprinkled on a wound, it will heal immediately”. Even in the 20th century, the admiration for the mausoleum of this master remained so strong that those passing by it on horseback dismounted, and pedestrians took off their hats. Once every 3–4 years, a meeting of all the masters who considered Boboyi Poradoz their patron was held in the mazar. For such meetings, common meals were arranged, and during Navruz, special celebrations were held for women.

In this mausoleum, there are graves of many people, besides Boboyi Poradoz. The mausoleum of Boboyi Poradoz is one of the few mausoleums built not for the burial of representatives of the ruling dynasty, nobility or clergy, but for the burial of a craftsman.

According to Sadruddin Salim Bukhari, in the Soviet years, a tractor that came to demolish the mausoleum stalled, and the driver died. That is why the mausoleum remained untouched. This shrine is visited by shoemakers, tailors and representatives of other professions. After Uzbekistan gained independence, this mausoleum was renovated at the initiative of businessman Abdulgafur Mirzaev.

== Architecture ==
The Boboyi Poradoz mausoleum is built in the style of Central Asian architecture. The mausoleum is built of brick, wood, stone and ganch.

The Boboyi Poradoz mausoleum has only one room, but consists of two parts: the central part (with a sagana, one side entrance and a mihrab) and side parts, formed by small projections in the walls of the central part. All walls have rectangular niches, starting from the top of the stone base. The sagana (a monument erected on a grave), located on a low rectangular platform, occupying most of the area, is in the eastern side of the room. The floor of the mausoleum is laid with brick - whole bricks and fragments of various shapes, among which scientists have found several fragments of unglazed clay. The top of the mausoleum consists of a small and a large dome. The interior of the mausoleum is made of marble, and for the convenience of pilgrims, there are seats on both sides.
