= Turki Jandi Mausoleum =

Mausoleum in Bukhara, Uzbekistan

Jandi Turki Mausoleum
- Turki Jandiy maqbarasi (Uzbek)
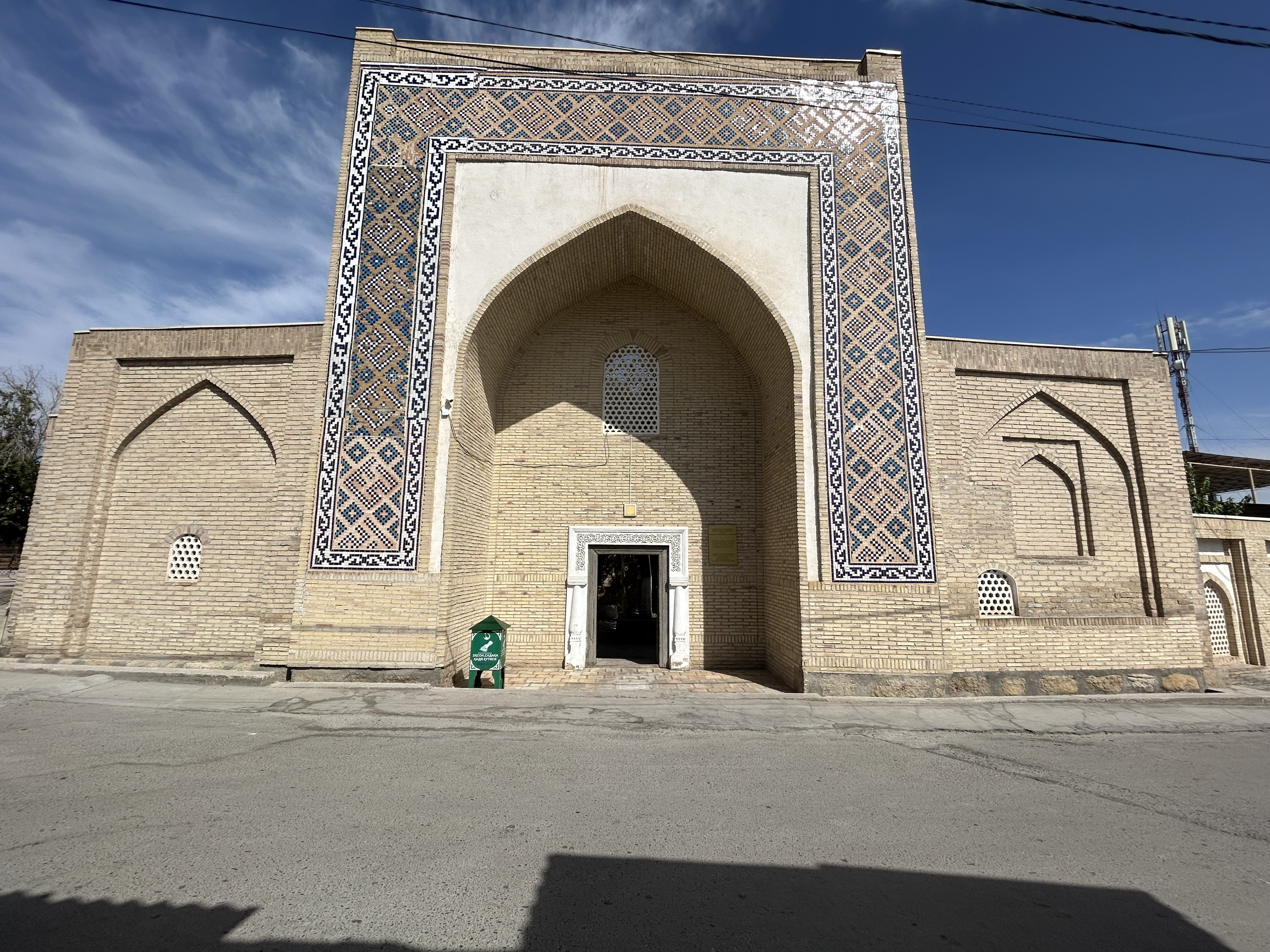
- Jandi Turki Mausoleum. The city of Bukhara in 2023
- Interactive map of Jandi Turki Mausoleum
- 39°46′14″N 64°24′57″E
- Location: Namozgoh Street, Bukhara, Uzbekistan
- Nearest city: Bukhara

History
- Built for: Mausoleum

Site notes
- Restored: 2020
- Governing body: Uzbekistan Government

Jandi Turki Mausoleum is situated on Namozgoh Street, in the old city section of Bukhara, Uzbekistan. It is associated with one of the famous imams from Bukhara's history in the middle centuries, Turki Jandi. There is said to be a tombstone in the mausoleum located in the southern part of Bukhara. This mausoleum has been listed in the national registry of intangible cultural heritage sites in Uzbekistan.

== History ==
Turki Jandi Mausoleum is located in the southern part of the Bukhara region. This area also encompasses the Turki Jandi cemetery. The mausoleum is associated with Abu Nasr Ahmad ibn Fazl ibn Muso al-Muzakkir al-Jandi. Many scholars and theologians were buried in this mausoleum cemetery. Abu Nasr Ahmad ibn Fazl ibn Muso al-Muzakkir al-Jandi passed away in the early 11th century, coming into prominence in the 16th to 17th centuries. A structure was built over Turki Jandi's mausoleum. Presently, the mausoleum of Turki Jandi has been destroyed, and places of worship have been constructed in its place. According to the research of the orientalist Komiljon Rahimov, the ruler Shams ul-Mulk Nasr ibn Ibrohim (1068—1080) was buried in this area. On Parfenova-Fenin's map of Bukhara from 1911 to 1912, the site of the mausoleum was marked as "Goʻrxonayi Xoqon".

== Architecture ==
Turki Jandi Mausoleum has inner dimensions of 4.2 by 4.25 meters, with walls that are 1.5 meters thick. The mausoleum is enclosed on two sides by a dome, with three entrances. The interior walls of the mausoleum are made of brick and adorned with carvings, while the floor is covered with clay. In front of the mausoleum lies the Turki Jandi Mosque. The mosque has a mihrab (prayer niche) on its southwestern side, reaching a height of 1.8 meters. The entrance to the mosque is on the western side, replaced with a new one. The Turki Jandi Mausoleum was constructed in the style of Central Asian architecture. The entrance portal to the mausoleum is rectangular, standing at a height of 12 meters and a width of 6.7 meters. The mausoleum underwent reconstruction in 2020 and was adorned with carvings.
