= Saroyi Tash Madrasah =

Madrasa in Bukhara, Uzbekistan

- Saroyi Tash madrasasi
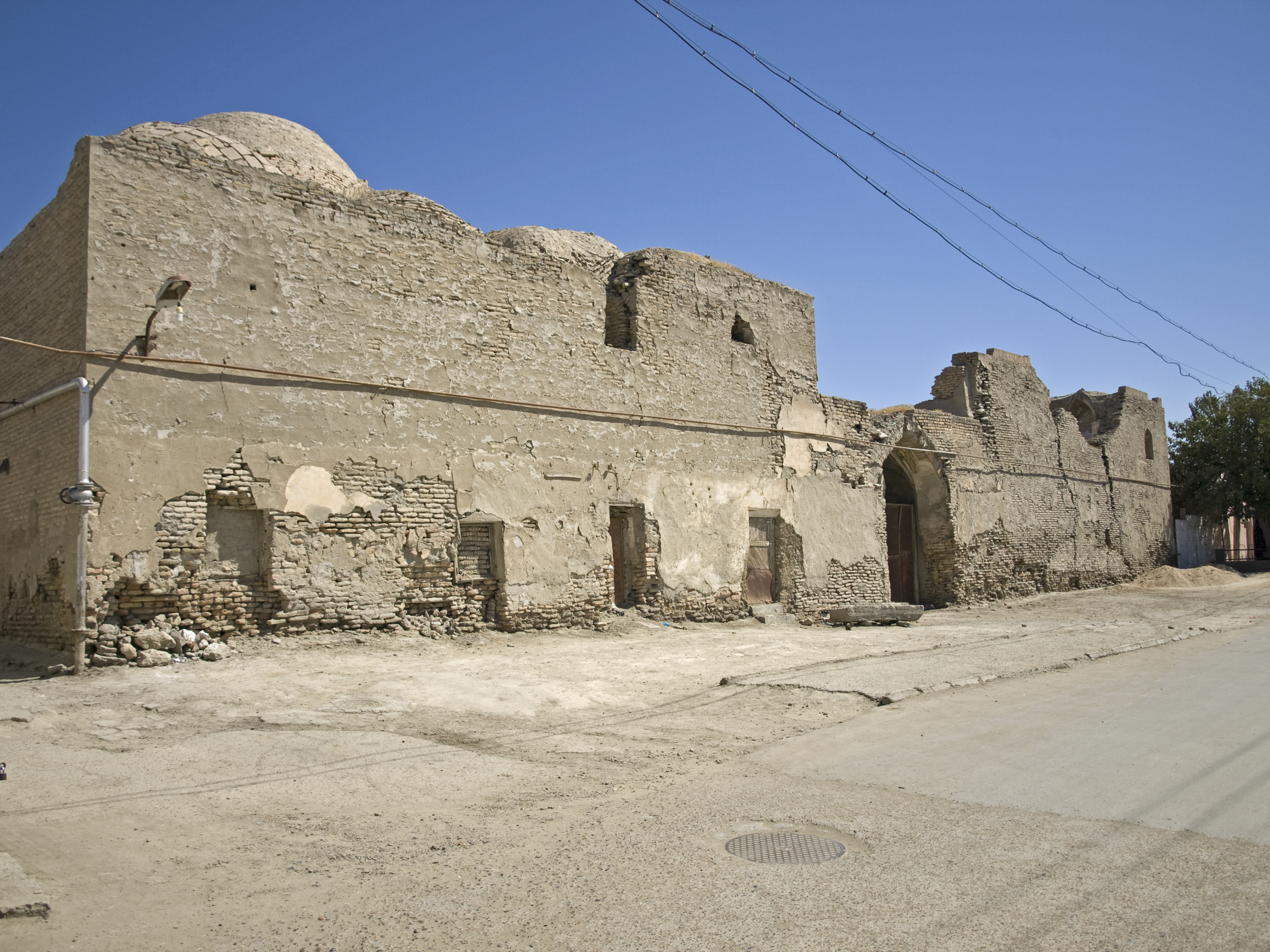

- Location within Uzbekistan

Religion
- Affiliation: Islam

Location
- Municipality: Bukhara
- Country: Uzbekistan
- Interactive map of Saroyi Tash Madrasah
- Coordinates: 39.77657°N 64.42061°E

Architecture
- Style: Architecture of Central Asia

Saroyi Tash Madrasah — Madrasah in the historical center of Bukhara, erected in the 18th century during the reign of representatives of the Uzbek dynasty Ashtarkhanids (or Mangyts). Located on the Samarkand street of the Kukaldosh mahallah. The architectural monument is included in the «National list of real estate objects of material cultural heritage of Uzbekistan». It is currently the subject of a tourist show. The building of the Saroyi Tash Madrasah has survived to this day in a very poor condition. The state program provided for the study, dismantling of emergency areas, constructive strengthening and restoration of the Madrasah in 2010.
