= Shadibi Madrasah =

Madrasa in Bukhara, Uzbekistan

Shadibi madrasah
- Shodibiy madrasasi
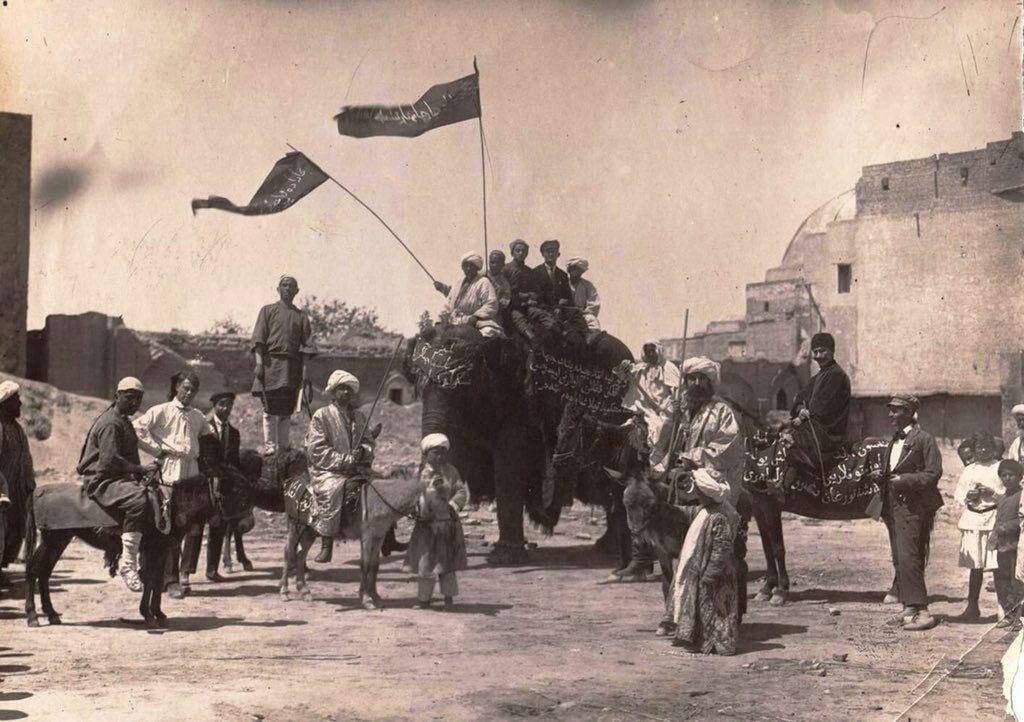

General information
- Status: under the protection of the state
- Type: Madrasah
- Architectural style: Central Asian architecture
- Town or city: Bukhara Region
- Country: Uzbekistan
- Opened: XVI century
- Owner: Shadibi Atalik

Technical details
- Material: brick, wood, stone and ganch
- Size: 87 cells

Shadibi madrasah is located in Bukhara. The madrasah has not been preserved today. Shadibi madrasah was built by Shadibi ataliq ibn Lalbi ataliq in the 16th century in the west of Registan, during the reign of Shaybani ruler Abdullah Khan II, who ruled in Bukhara Khanate.

== About ==
It is one of the third-level higher madrasahs in Bukhara, and educated students from Banorasposh mudarris. According to Abdurauf Fitrat, the annual endowment amount is 40,000 taka. Research scientist Abdusattor Jumanazarov studied a number of documents related to this madrasah and provided information related to the madrasah. There are 4 foundation documents related to the madrasah. The madrasah was built of raw and baked bricks and had an outer courtyard. To the west and north of the madrasah were courtyards and the Sitorai Mohi Hossa Mosque, to the east was the Sitorai Mohi Hossa Madrasah, and to the south was the street. The waqf for the madrasah endows land in the village of Joyi Nahri Haq in the Nasaf province. In addition, the waqf turned the shops and courtyards on the south-eastern side of the madrasah into the property of the waqf. The madrasah was appointed by a judge. Mutawwali received a tithe from the harvest of the waqf lands. At the madrasah, Mutawwali supervised the learning process. Students who did not attend classes for 2 months and 10 days without an excuse were expelled from their studies. Two students lived in each room of the madrasah. A copy of this document is certified by the seal of Amir Shahmurad. Many more documents related to this madrasah have been found and studied. The mufti was paid 2,600 taka per year for his lessons. This madrasah was destroyed during the Soviet revolution. The Shadibi madrasah consisted of 87 rooms. This madrasah was built in the style of Central Asian architecture. The madrasah is built of brick, wood, stone and ganch.
