= Architecture in Central Asia =

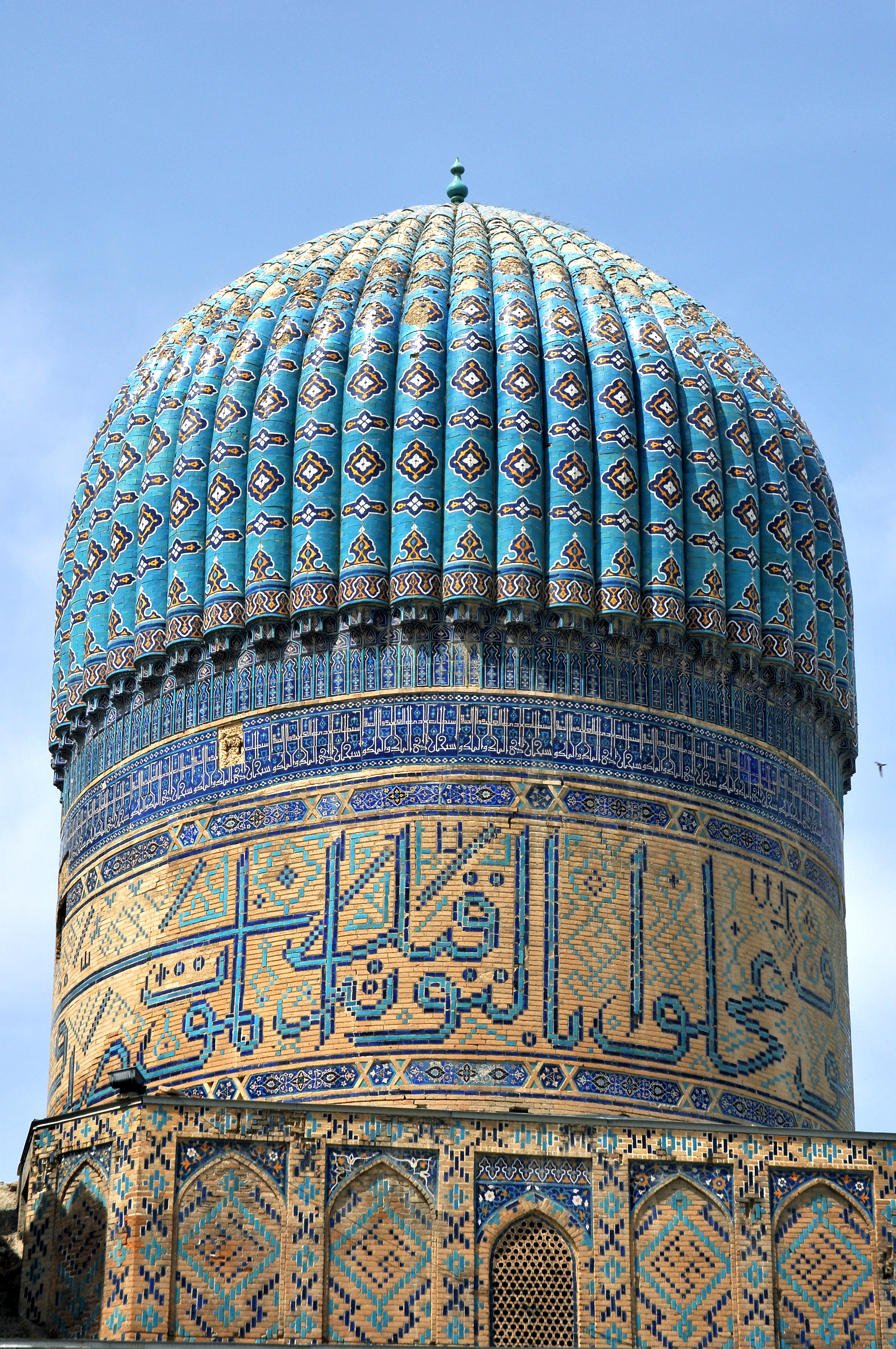
Dome of Bibi-Khanym mosque, Samarkand, Uzbekistan

Architecture in Central Asia refers to the architectural styles of the numerous societies that have occupied Central Asia throughout history. These styles include a regional tradition of Islamic and Iranian architecture, including Timurid architecture of the 14th and 15th centuries, as well as 20th-century Soviet Modernism. Central Asia is an area that encompasses land from the Xinjiang Province of China in the East to the Caspian Sea in the West. The region is made up of the countries of Kazakhstan, Uzbekistan, Tajikistan, Kyrgyzstan, and Turkmenistan. The influence of Timurid architecture can be recognised in numerous sites in Kazakhstan and Uzbekistan, whilst the influence of Persian architecture is seen frequently in Uzbekistan and in some examples in Turkmenistan. Examples of Soviet architecture can be found in Uzbekistan, Kazakhstan, Tajikistan and Kyrgyzstan.

== Pre-Islamic period ==
The art and architecture of ancient Transoxiana was related to that of the Parthians and Sassanians, who ruled over the region. There were nonetheless some distinctive local traditions and trends. In Sogdia, a number of vivid wall paintings have been uncovered in temples and private buildings in several towns, such as the Penjikent murals. These date from roughly the 5th to 7th centuries. The architecture of pre-Islamic Sogdia most likely influenced later Islamic architecture in the region, particularly during the Samanid period from the 9th and 10th centuries.

== Islamic architecture ==
=== Early Islamic period ===
The Muslim conquest of Transoxiana was completed by the mid-8th century, after which the local population progressively converted to Islam. By the 10th century, the political authority of the Abbasid Caliphate had declined and regional empires and dynasties emerged, including the Samanid dynasty, which ruled in Khurasan and Transoxiana.

It is around this time, in the 10th century, that distinctive regional features begin to appear that would characterize Islamic architecture in Iran and Central Asia. These characteristics include the use of baked brick as the dominant medium for both construction and decoration, in addition to the use of ceramic tile for surface decoration. Muqarnas, a form of three-dimensional geometric vaulting that became characteristic of Islamic architecture more widely, also seems to have developed in this region around this time as a transitional architectural element, initially a tripartite subdivision of the more traditional squinch. For mosques, the hypostyle layout of early Islamic architecture continued to be used, alongside new types like multi-domed mosques.

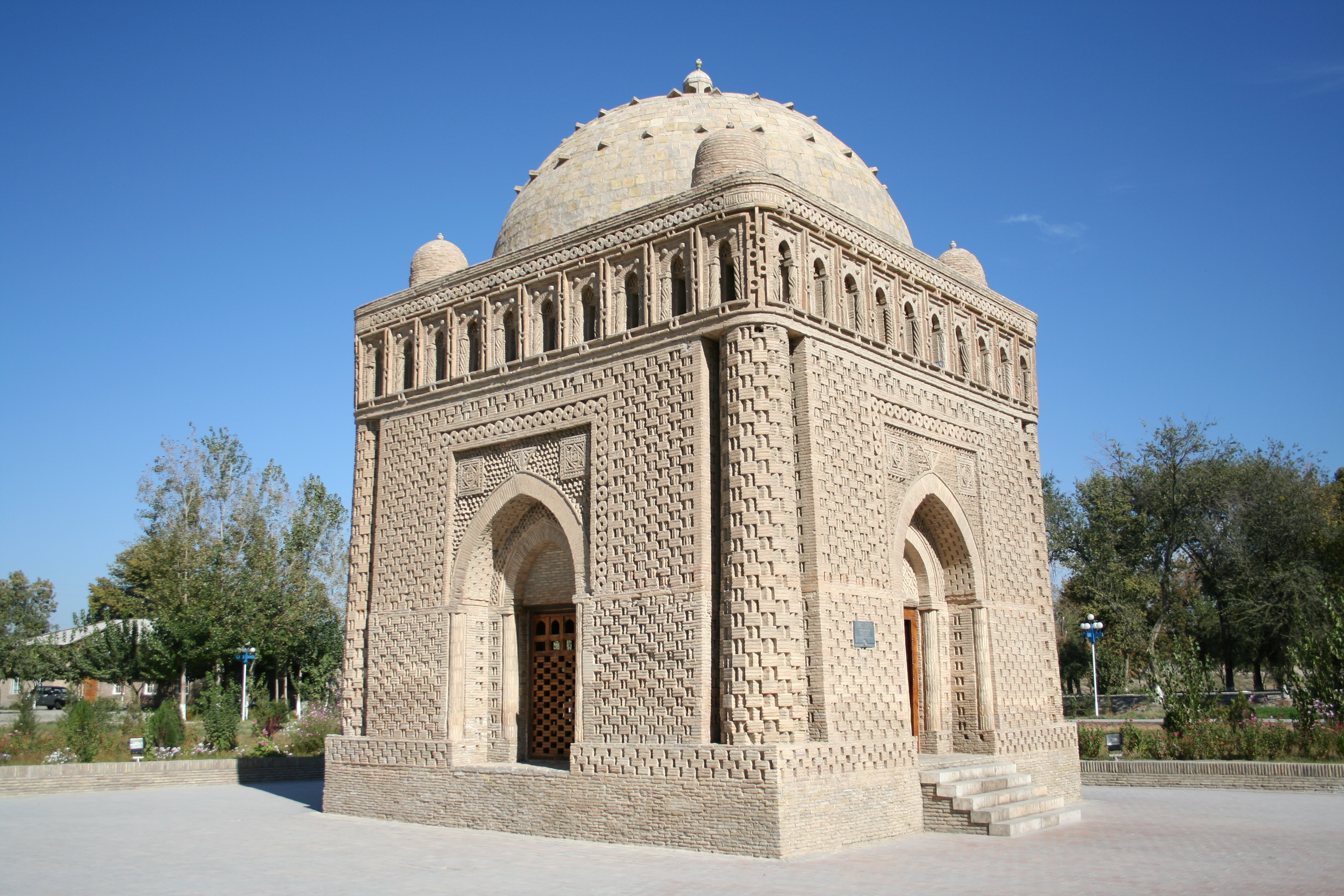
The Samanid Mausoleum in Bukhara (10th century)

Among the most notable monuments of this period is the Samanid Mausoleum in Bukhara, one of the oldest preserved mausoleums in the Islamic world. It is a small brick structure with a square floor plan covered by a dome that rests on four corner squinches. Its decorative brickwork and its balanced, unified design make it an important monument in the region's architectural history.

=== Seljuk and Qarakhanid era ===
Turkic peoples began moving west across Central Asia and towards the Middle East from the 8th century onward. The most significant of these were the Seljuk Turks, who formed the Great Seljuk Empire in the 11th century, conquering all of Iran and other extensive territories in Central Asia and the Middle East. Around the same time, between the late 10th century and the early 13th century, the Turkic Qarakhanids ruled in Transoxiana. Further east, the major powers were the Ghaznavids, who became independent in the late 10th century and ruled from Ghazna, in present-day Afghanistan, and the Ghurids, who replaced them in the second half of the 12th century.

This period is also regarded as a "classical" age of Central Asian architecture. The apogee of the Great Seljuks was short-lived, but their architectural patronage was an important stage in the evolution of architecture in Iran and Central Asia. The other empires and dynasties in the region, including the Qarakhanids, the Ghaznavids, and the Ghurids, built their monuments in a very similar style, so that a certain architectural style came to be shared across most of the eastern Islamic world during this time. Some of the most important Seljuk monuments are found in present-day Iran. The Great Mosque of Isfahan, for example, attests to one of the major developments at this time: the elaboration of the four-iwan plan for mosque architecture, which quickly became a recurring type across the region.

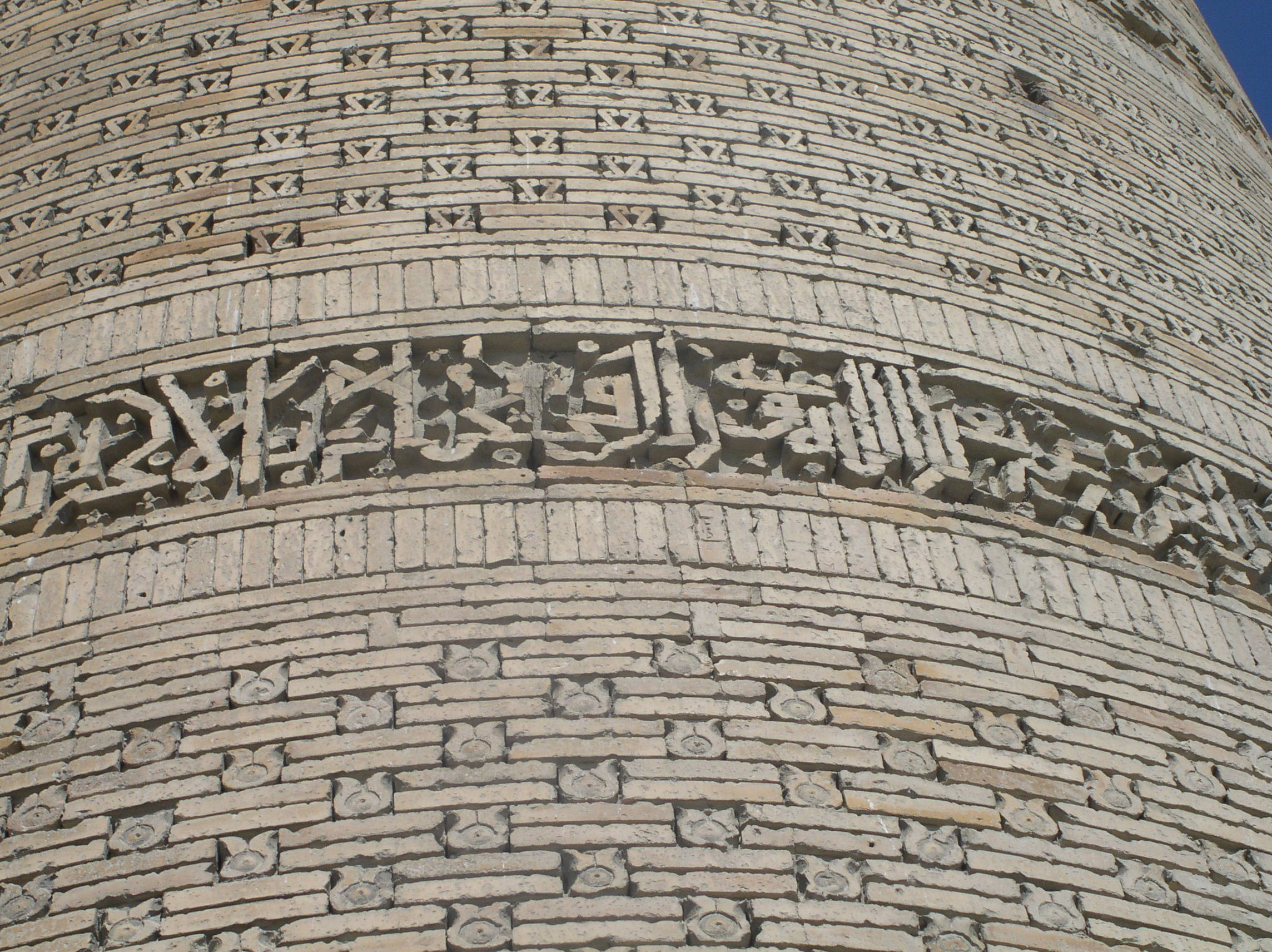
Kufic inscription and brickwork on the minaret of Vabkent from the Qarakhanid period, showing terracotta plugs of different shape inserted between stacks of regular bricks

Meanwhile, the Qarakhanid dynasty erected many impressive structures in Bukhara and Samarkand (present-day Uzbekistan). Among the surviving religious monuments of Qarakhanid architecture are the great congregational mosque in Bukhara, of which only the Kalyan Minaret (c. 1127) survives (later integrated into the present day Po-i-Kalyan), as well as the nearby Minaret of Vabkent (1141). Several Qarakhanid mausoleums with monumental façades have also survived, such as those in Uzgen (present-day Kyrgyzstan) from the second half of the 12th century. The Qarakhanids themselves were often vassals of other, more powerful states, but their monuments still exhibit some minor local features that distinguish them from other patrons in the region. This style was influenced by earlier Samanid architecture and it continued to be present in the region after the dynasty itself ended in 1212, eventually becoming one of the influences on later Timurid architecture. According to a study by Richard Piran McClary, the most distinctly Qarakhanid features are mainly found in decoration. One feature is the presence of a wide central rib in the semi-domes of portals and squinches (e.g. at the Aisha Bibi Tomb in Taraz). Another is the insertion of terracotta blocks, cut in various shapes, into the gaps between stacks of regular bricks that make up the exterior walls of monuments (e.g. in the Minaret of Vabkent).

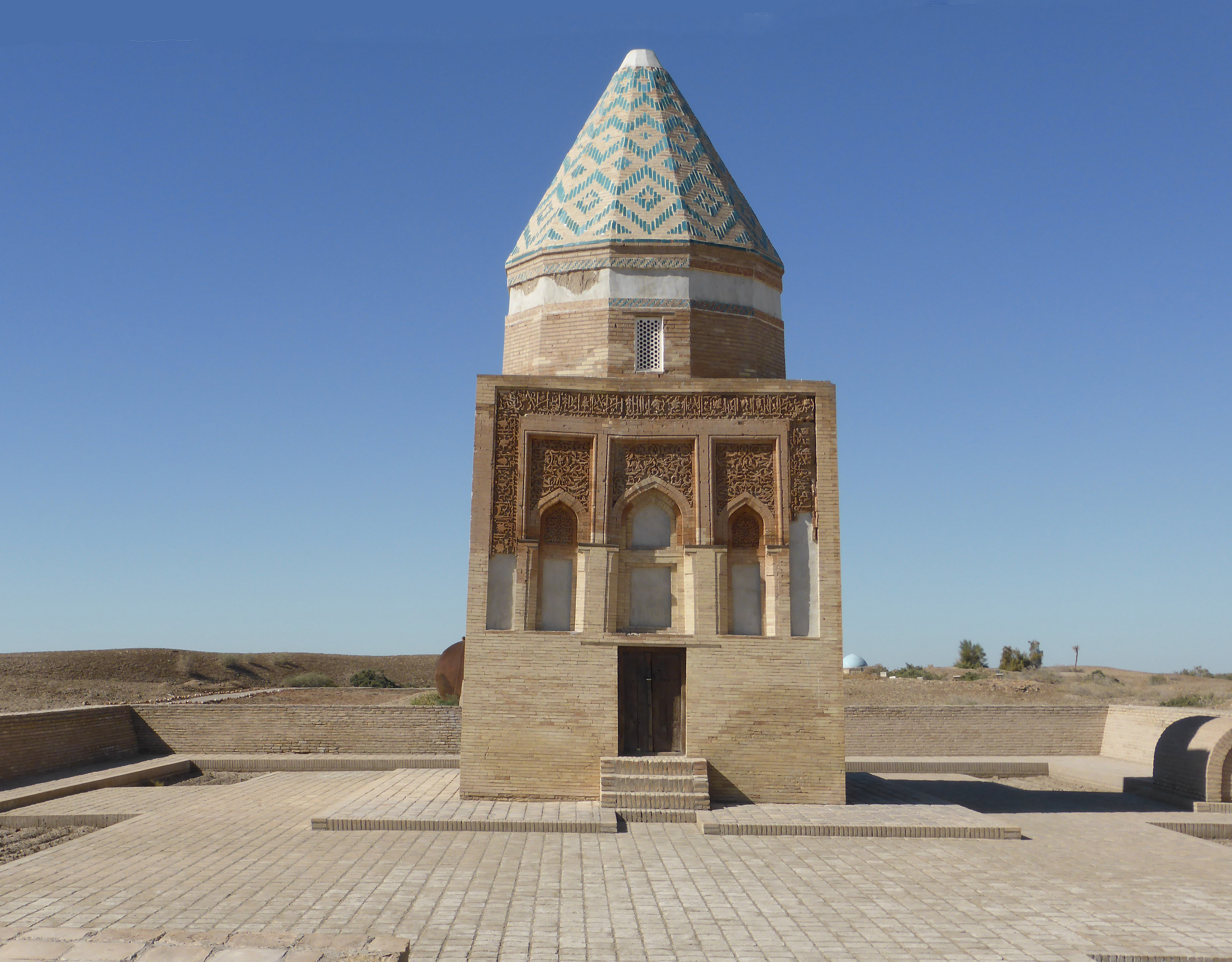
Mausoleum of Fakhr al-Din Razi or Il-Arslan in Kunya-Urgench, Turkmenistan, late 12th or early 13th century (Khwarazmian period)

Among the most remarkable monuments of Ghurids and Ghaznavids in present-day Afghanistan are a number of ornate brick towers and minarets which have survived as stand-alone structures. Their exact functions are unclear. They include the Ghaznavid Tower of Mas'ud III (early 12th century) and the Ghurid Minaret of Jam (late 12th century).

The Khwarazm-Shahs took advantage of the Seljuk decline in the 12th century to expand and form their own Khwarazmian Empire across Iran and Central Asia, before falling to the Mongol invasions in the early 13th century. The site of the former Khwarazmian capital, Kunya-Urgench (present-day Turkmenistan), has preserved several monuments from the Khwarazmian Empire period (late 12th and early 13th century), including the so-called Mausoleum of Fakhr al-Din Razi (which may actually be the tomb of Il-Arslan) and the Mausoleum of Sultan Tekesh.

=== Timurid architecture ===
The Timurid Empire was founded by Timur in 1370 and contained areas of present-day Uzbekistan and Kazakhstan. Timurid architecture employed some Seljuk traditions, and featured grand scale buildings constructed from fired bricks. The exteriors of buildings were decorated with highly detailed blue and turquoise linear and geometric patterning of glazed tiles, inspired by Iranian Banna’i technique. As is consistent with Islamic architecture, Timurid architecture also often features domes and minarets, the latter from which the call to prayer is called.

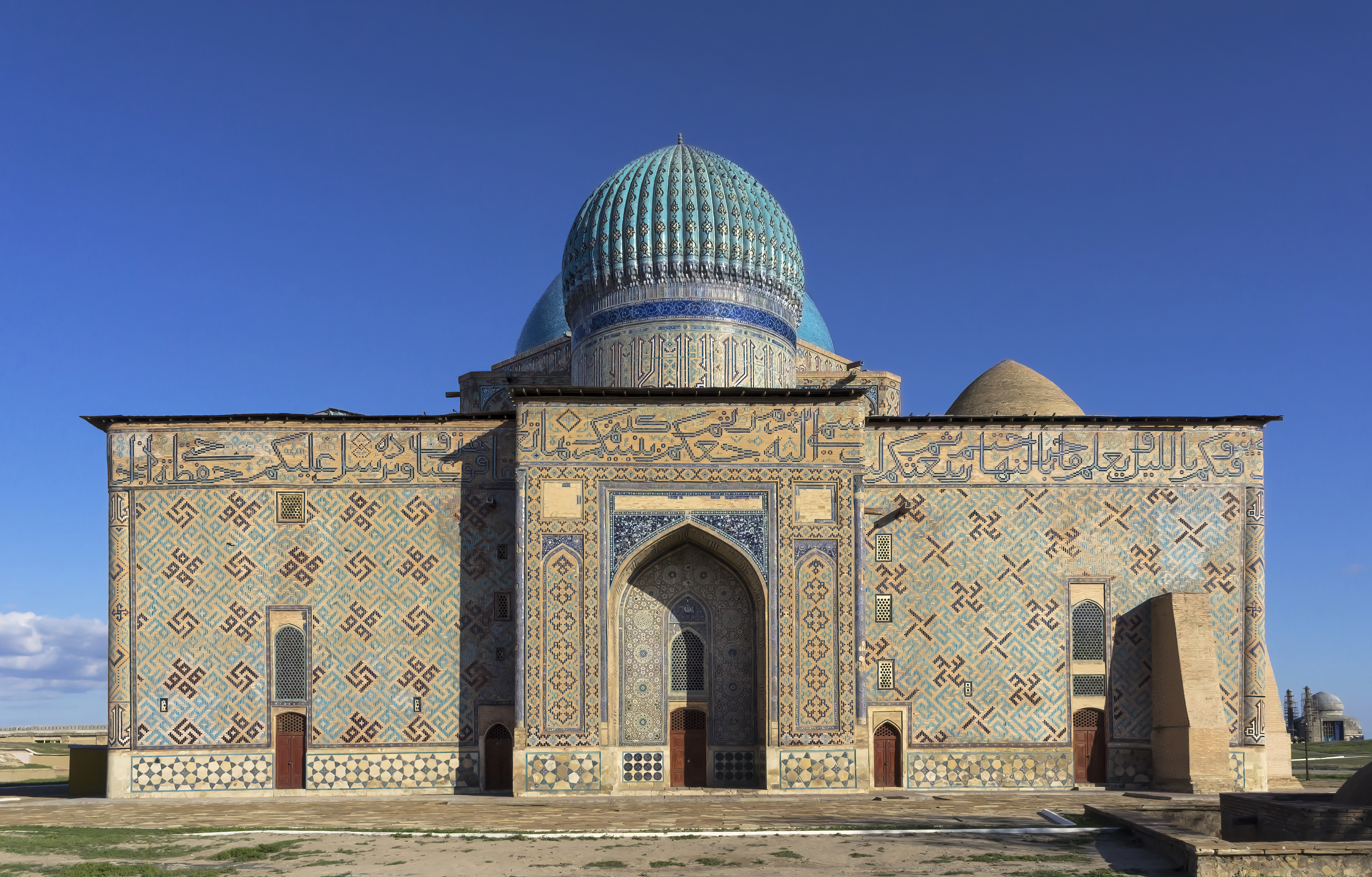
Mausoleum of Khoja Ahmed Yasawi, Turkistan, Kazakhstan.

In the south of modern-day Kazakhstan, the influence of the Timurid Empire can also be found in Turkistan. An example of this architecture is the Mausoleum of Khoja Ahmed Yasawi, which was commissioned in 1389 by Timur in order to replace a smaller 12th century Mausoleum for Khoja Ahmed Yasawi. The partly unfinished mausoleum is an example of the Islamic stylings of Timurid architecture. It features fired brick construction and geometric patterned decorations made with glazed tiles. The mausoleum also features tiled patterns on the interior of the building.

In Uzbekistan, numerous examples of Timurid architecture can be found in Samarkand, which was the capital of the Timurid Empire from its establishment in 1370 until it moved to Herat in the early 15th century. As it was the royal city, Timur often brought artisans back from defeated cities to build in Samarkand. An example of Timurid Architecture in Samarkand is the Bibi-Khanym Mosque. The mosque was built between 1399 and 1404 in order to commemorate the wife of Timur, and was completed before Timur’s death in 1405. At the time of construction, it was one of the largest mosques in the world and is still the largest in Samarkand. As is consistent with other Timurid architecture, the mosque features glazed ceramic designs, a turquoise dome and geometric patterning of walls. Another notable example of Timurid architecture found in Samarkand is the Gur-e-Amir (or Gur-Emir) Mausoleum. Built in 1403 and 1404, the mausoleum is the tomb of Timur and his sons Shah Rukh and Miran Shah, along with other family members. The mausoleum is decorated with blue and white tiles, as well as large mosaics. These are features of Timurid architecture and also exhibit Iranian influence. The building also features a large Islamic-style dome and minarets that were refurbished in the 1950s. Timur was born in Shahrisabz, an Uzbekistani city located roughly 50 miles South of Samarkand. In the city, Timur also constructed Aq Saray (White Palace) in 1380 after a victorious battle with Urgench. Despite only part of the original building remaining, Aq Saray also demonstrates being decorated by geometrically patterned glazed tiles, a feature found throughout Timurid Architecture.

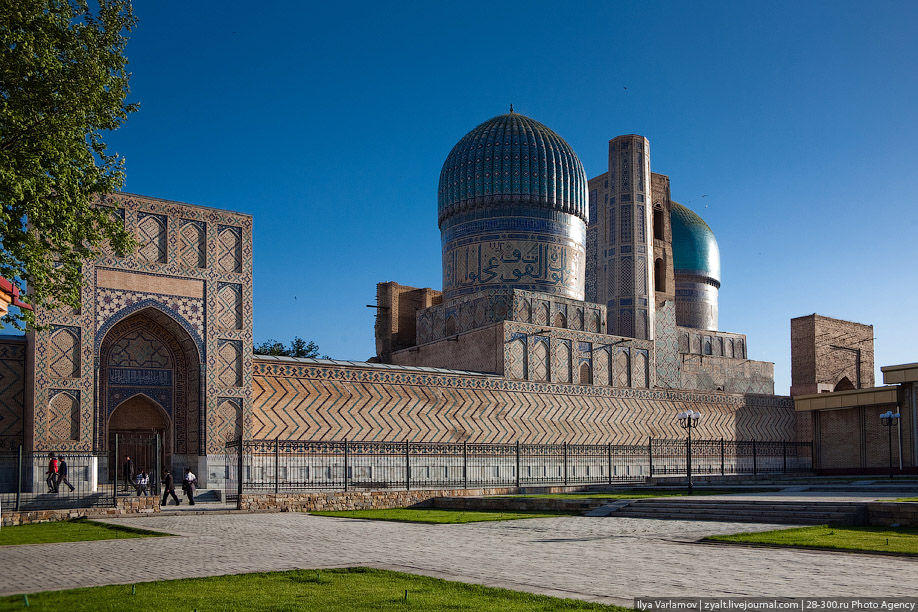
Bibi Khanym Mosque, Samarkand.

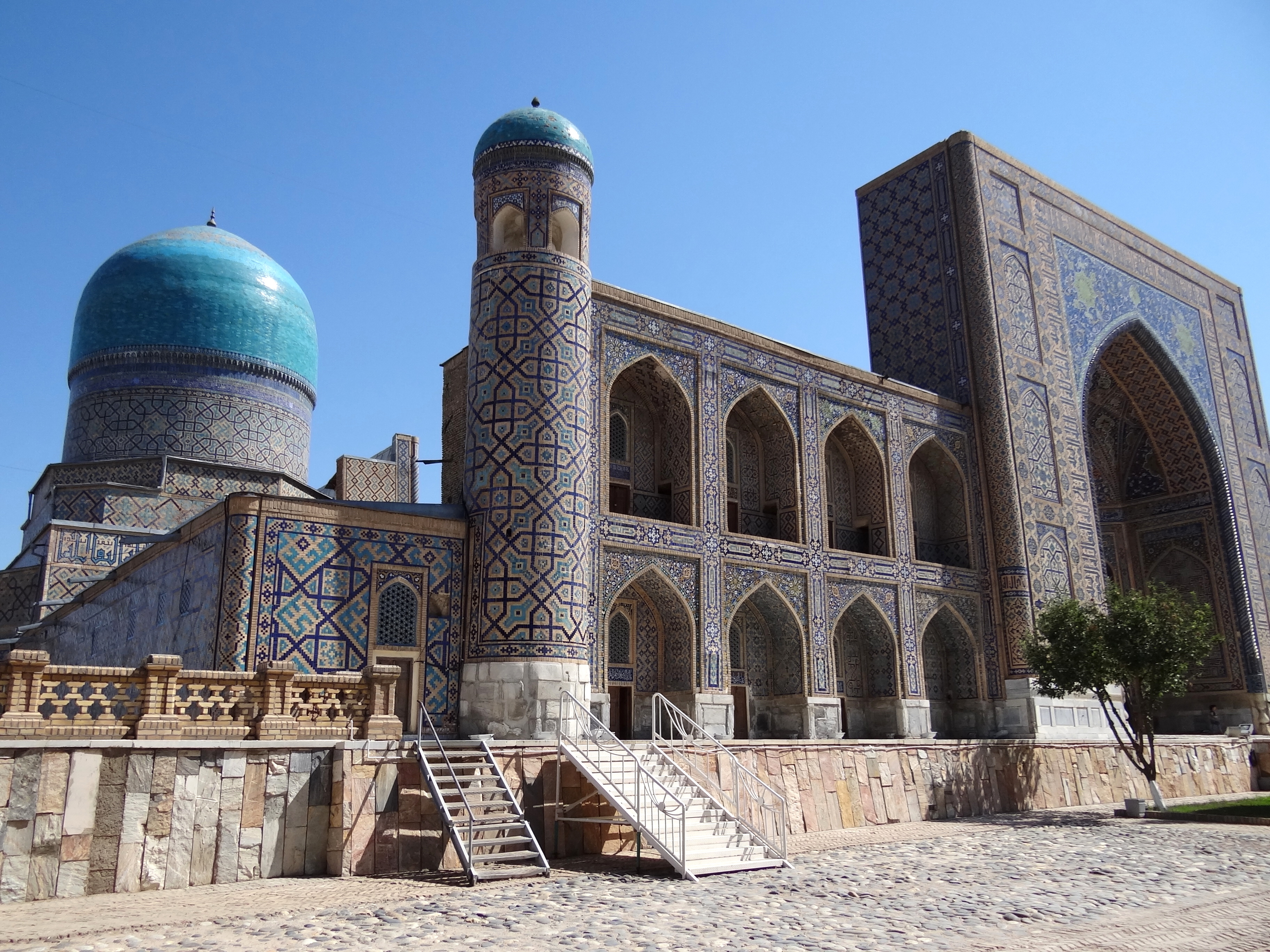
Bibi Khanym Mosque, Samarkand.

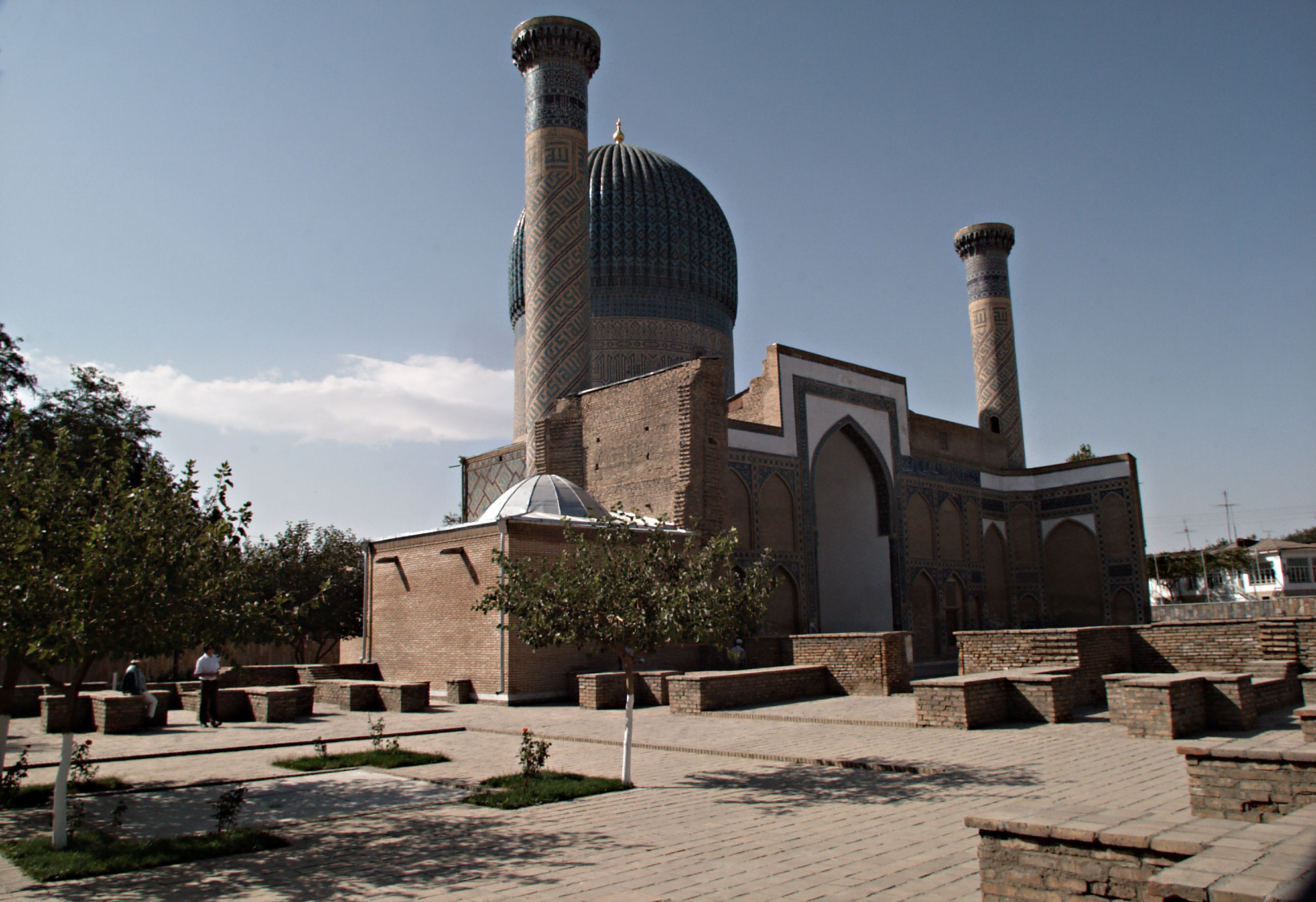
Gur-E-Emir Mausoleum, Samarkand.

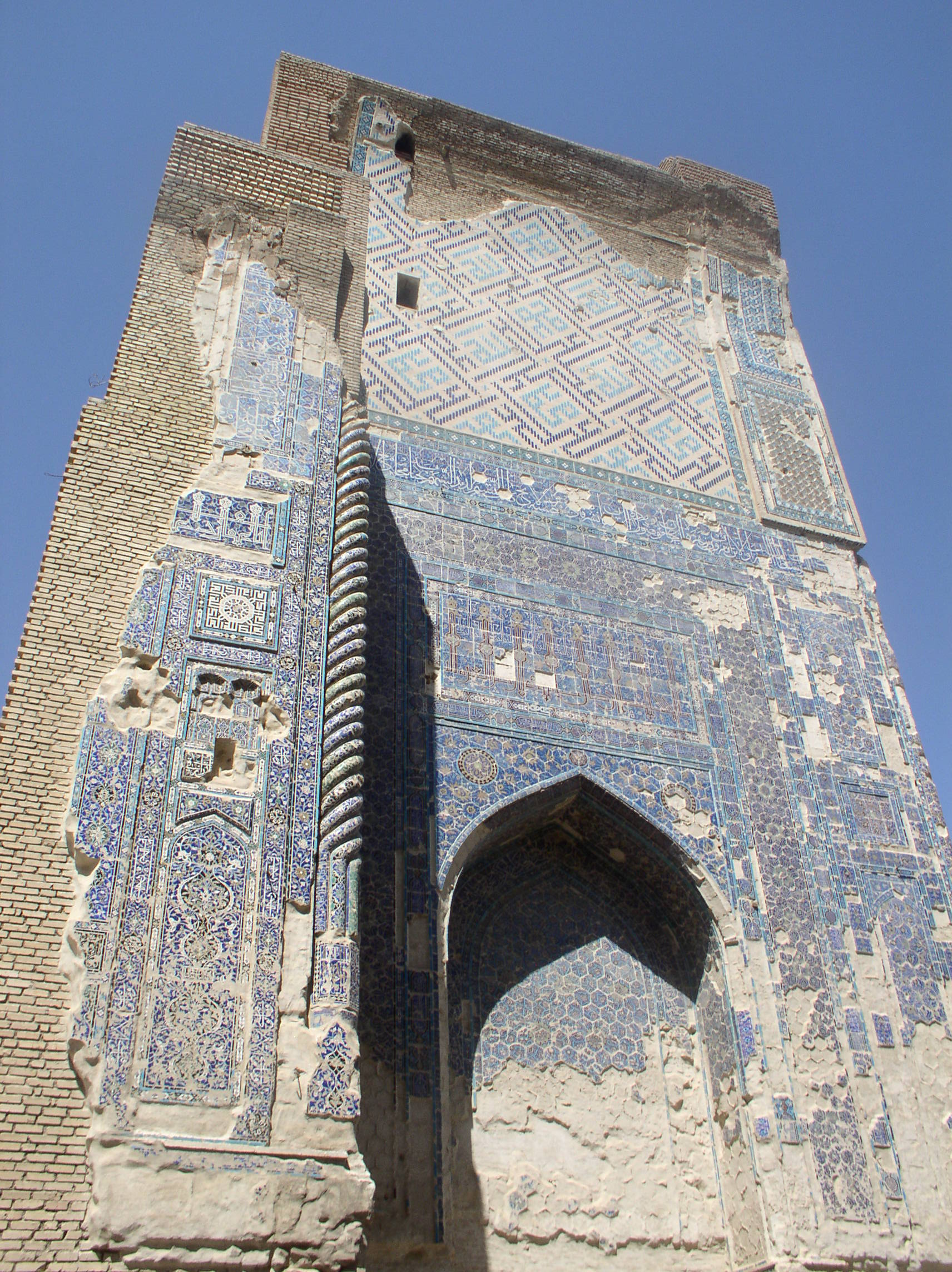
Aq Saray (White Palace), Shahrizsabz.

=== Post-Timurid period ===
After the Timurids, various regional dynasties and ruling groups controlled Central Asia, including the Shaybanids and other Uzbek tribal leaders. Monumental buildings continued to be built here, drawing on the traditional Timurid style.

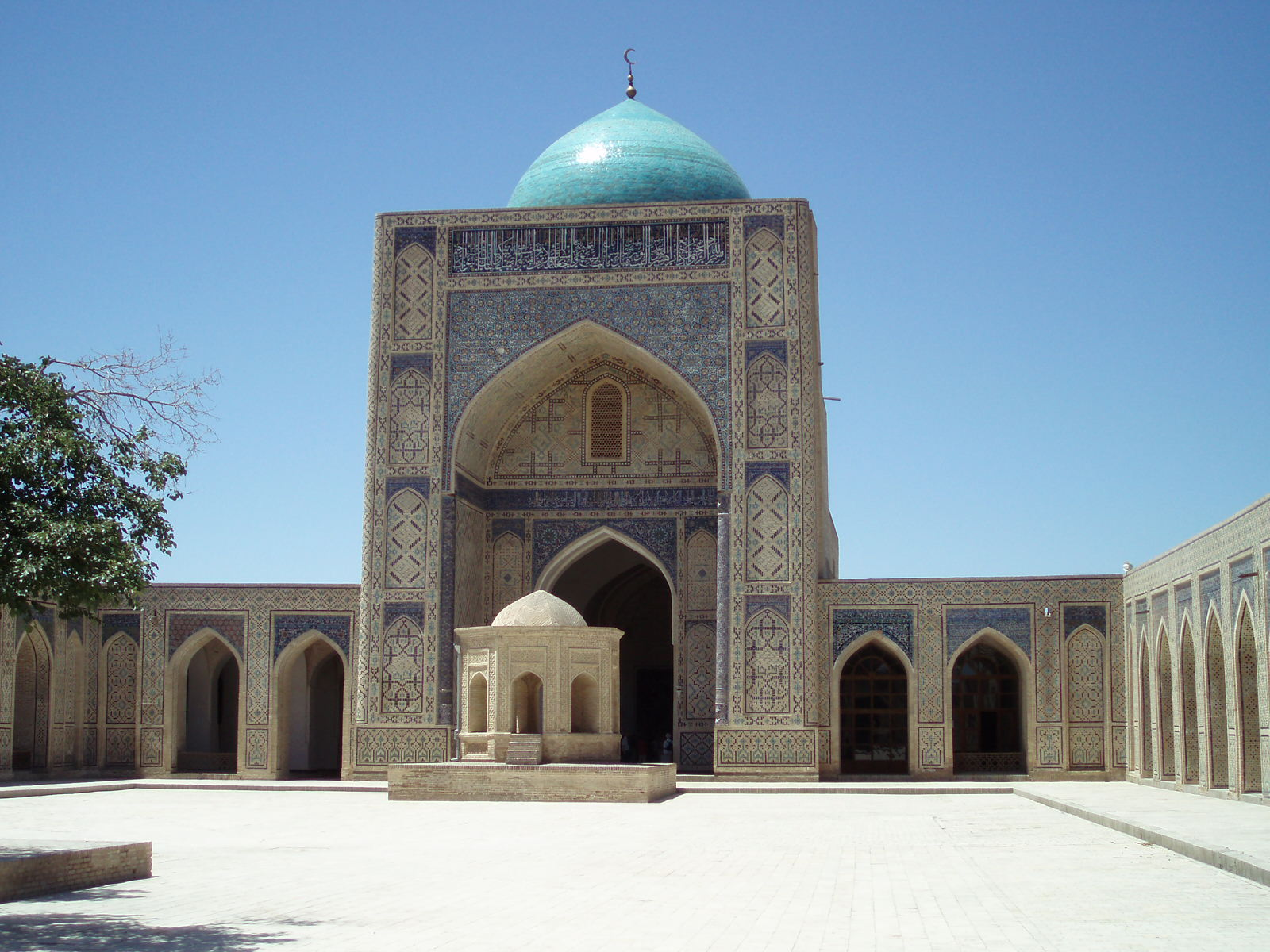
Courtyard of the Po-i-Kalyan Mosque in Bukhara (16th century), looking towards the iwan that leads to the maqsura

In Bukhara, the Shaybanids created the present Po-i-Kalyan complex, integrating the Qarakhanid-era Kalan Minaret, renovating the old mosque in 1514, and adding the large Mir-i 'Arab Madrasa (1535–6). The mosque's design follows the traditional layout, with a large rectangular courtyard surrounded by four iwans and prayer halls covered by domes supported on pillars. The maqsura (area near the mihrab) is covered by a large double-shelled dome set on a tall cylindrical drum. The mosque is built of brick and uses both tilework and brickwork for decoration.

Later, in Samarkand, the local ruler Yalangtush Bi Alchin gave the Registan its current appearance by building two new madrasas across from the Ulugh Beg Madrasa. The Sherdar Madrasa (1616–1636) imitates the form of the Ulugh Beg Madrasa, while the Tilakari Madrasa (1646–1660) is both a mosque and a madrasa.

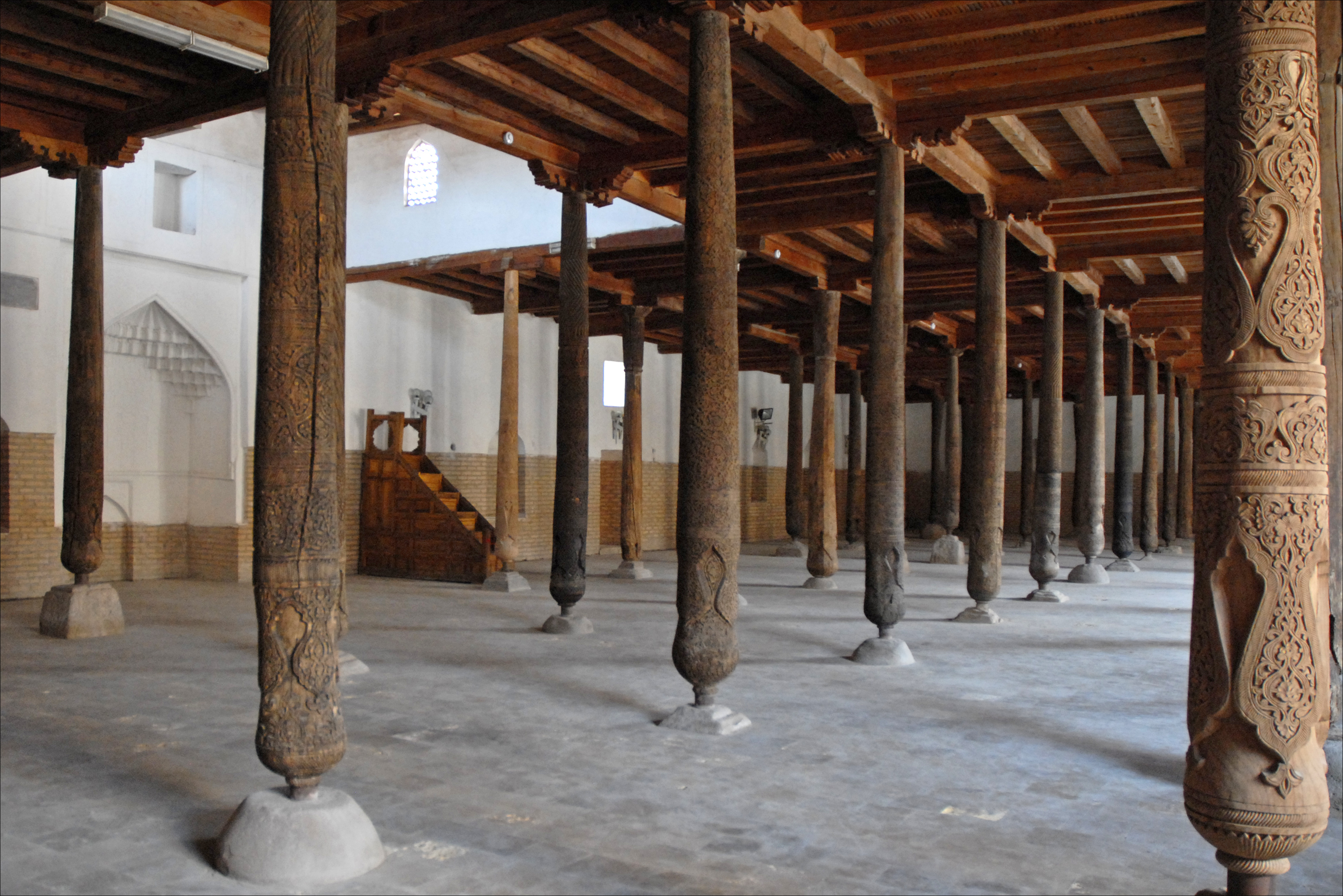
Wooden hypostyle prayer hall of the Friday Mosque of Khiva (18th century)

Architectural activity became less significant in the region after the 17th century, with the exception of Khiva, the center of the Khanate of Khiva. The Friday mosque of Khiva, with its distinctive hypostyle hall of wooden columns, was rebuilt in this form in 1788–9. The mosque, along with some of the city's other historic Islamic-era monuments, are located within Itchan Kala, the inner fortified section of the city. A later monument in Bukhara, built under the Khanate of Khiva, is the Chor Minor (Char Minar), completed in 1807. It served as the gateway to madrasa and has an unusual design: a tetrapylon crowned by four heavy circular corner towers.

== Soviet architecture ==
Under the Union of Soviet Socialist Republics (USSR), the present-day countries of Kazakhstan, Uzbekistan, Tajikistan, Kyrgyzstan, and Turkmenistan were incorporated into the Soviet Union in 1924. These peoples were classified as the nations of Kazakh Soviet Socialist Republic (SSR), Uzbek SSR, Tajik SSR, Kirghiz SSR and Turkmen SSR by the Soviets. These countries remained members of the USSR until declaring independence in 1991, the year of the dissolution of the Union of Soviet Socialist Republics. During their membership of the USSR, the architecture of Kazakhstan, Uzbekistan, Tajikistan and Kyrgyzstan were influenced by Soviet Modernism. Soviet Modernism shares many of the features of Modernist architecture worldwide, including asymmetrical compositions using geometric shapes, flat roofs, modern materials and minimal ornamentation. Whilst maintaining a distinct Soviet appearance, many buildings also incorporated local stylings.

Numerous examples of Soviet architecture can be found in Tashkent, the capital city of Uzbekistan. The Tashkent Circus building was built in 1976, and demonstrates the incorporation of local design influence by Soviet architects, along with the use of modern materials seen in Soviet Modernism. Another example found in Tashkent is the 17 storey Hotel Uzbekistan. Built in 1974, the still-functioning hotel features geometric shapes with local influences visible, minimal ornamentation and a flat roof, all features commonly found in Soviet architecture.

Tashkent Circus, Tashkent.

Hotel Uzbekistan, Tashkent.

In Kazakhstan, numerous examples of Soviet architecture can be found in Almaty, the former Soviet capital of the country. At the Al-Farabi Kazakh National University, the Main Administrative building was built in the 1970s. The building features geometric shapes, a flat roof and modern materials consistent with Soviet architecture, whilst also incorporating local ornamentation. Another example found in Almaty is the State Academic Russian Theatre for Children and Youth, founded in October 1944. The building features Soviet Brutalist-style architecture with a flat roof, hard angles and minimal ornamentation. Also in Almaty is the Hotel Kazakhstan, a Soviet style building completed in 1977 featuring modern materials and minimal ornamentation on the building’s walls, and crown ornamentation on the building’s roof.

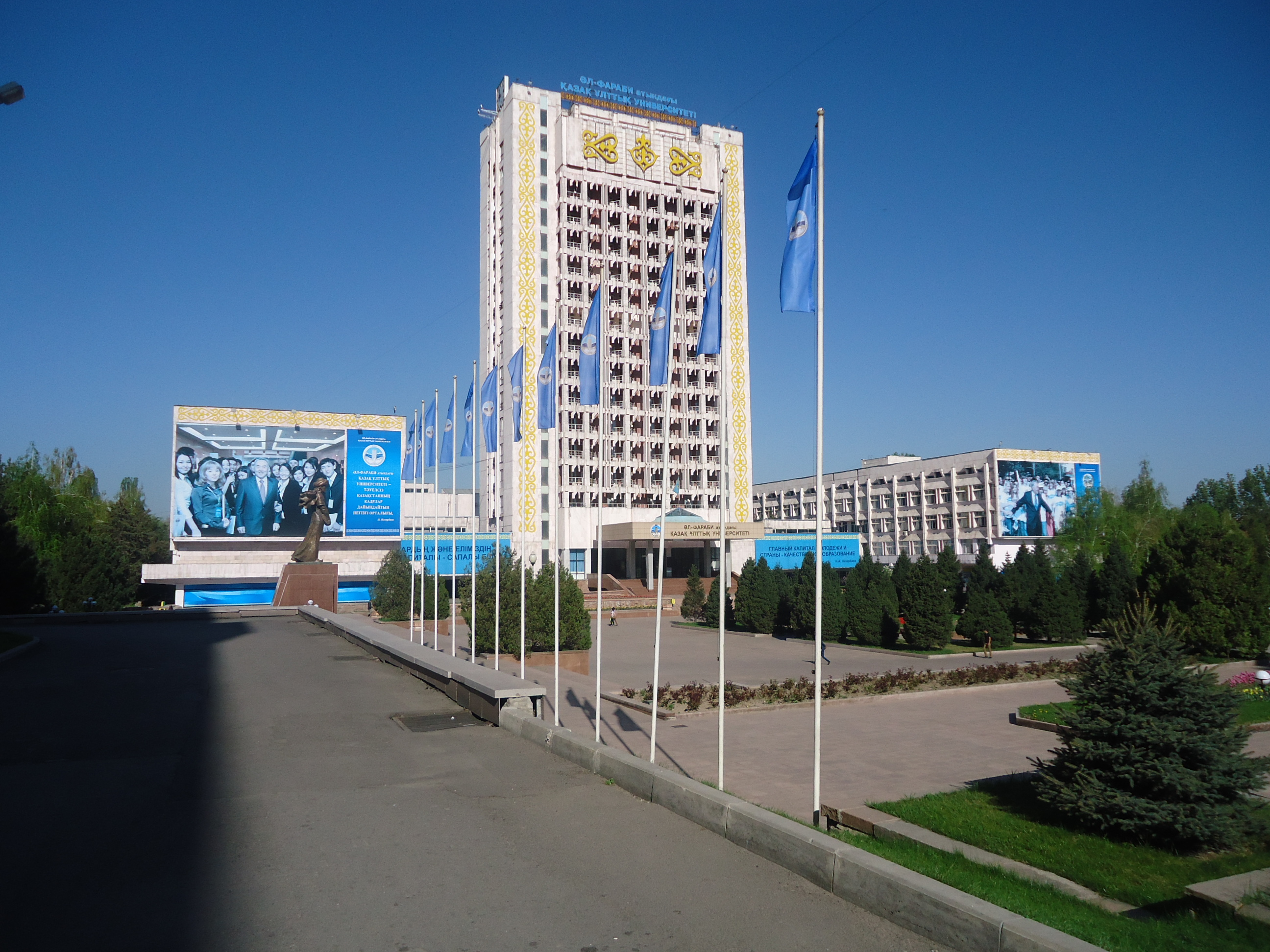
Al-Farabi Kazakh National University, Almaty.

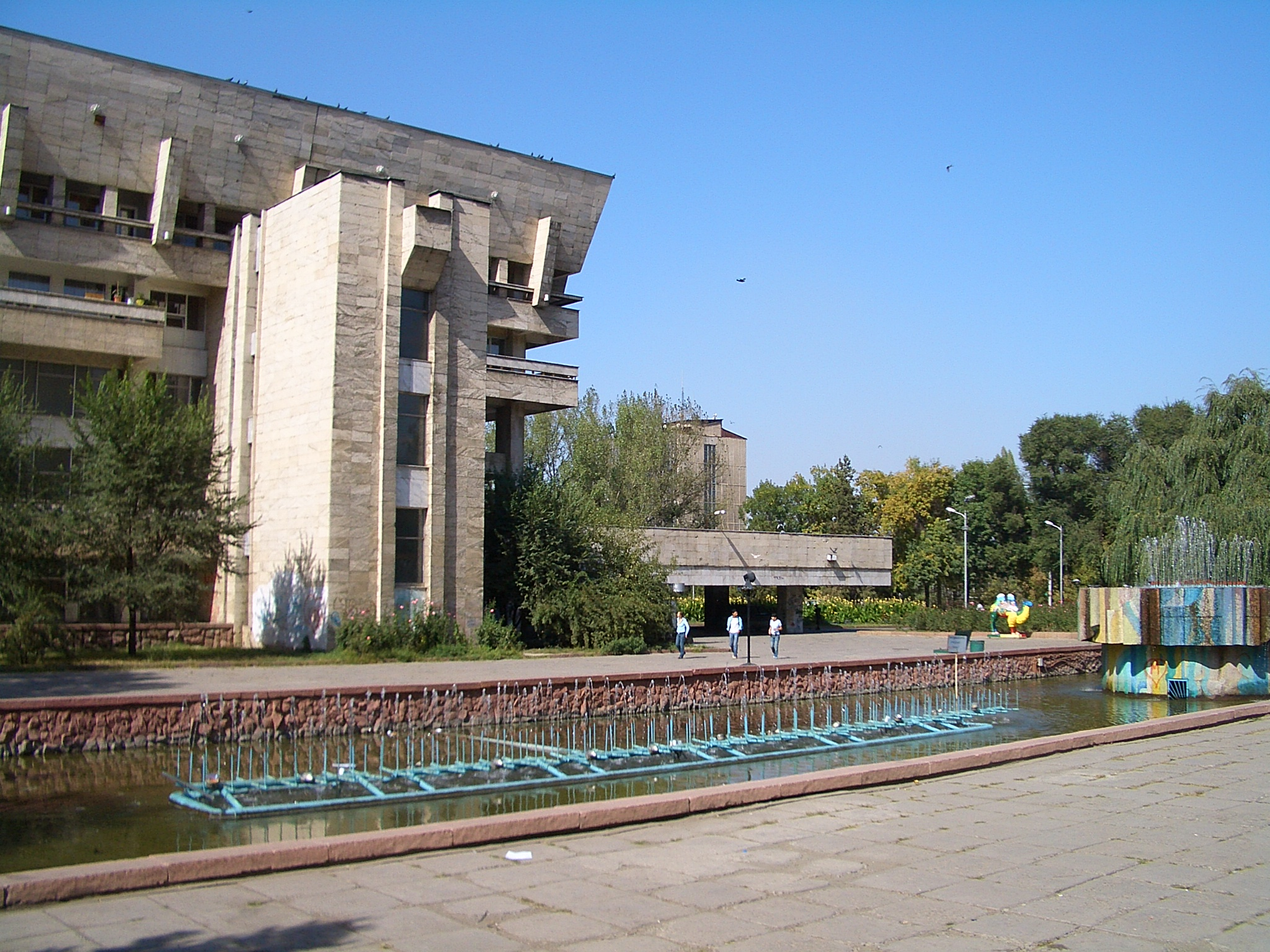
State Academic Russian Theatre for Children and Youth, Almaty.

Hotel Kazakhstan, Almaty.

In Tajikistan, the influence of Soviet architecture can be seen in the Dushanbe International Airport, the airport servicing the capital city of Dushanbe. The pictured terminal was opened in 1964, and features the use of modern glass materials and a flat roof. Another example in Dushanbe is the Concert Palace of Dushanbe, designed by Sergo Sutyagin. Completed in 1984, this structure features a flat roof, minimal ornamentation and a design consistent with Soviet architecture.

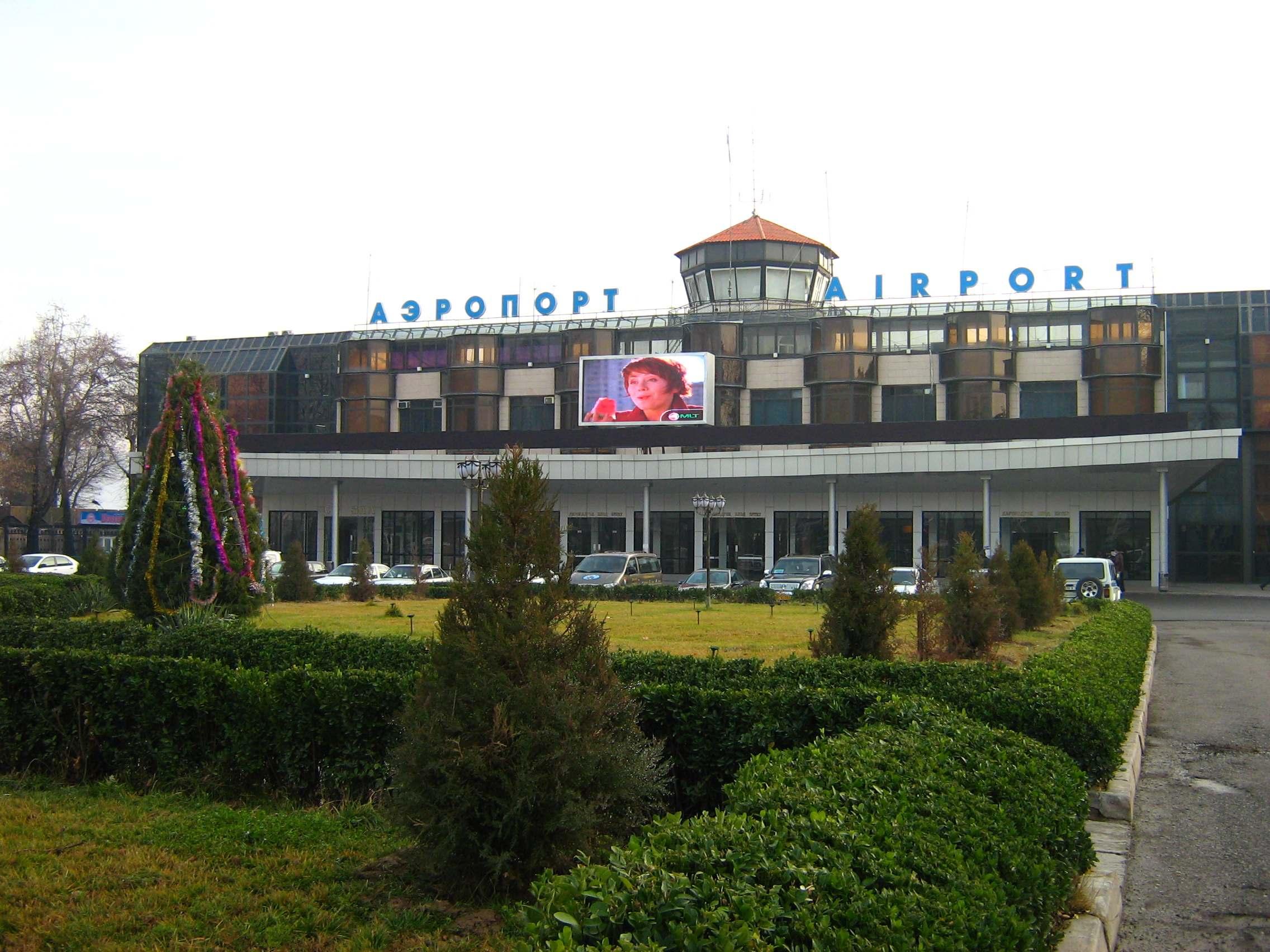
Dushanbe Airport, Dushanbe.

Concert Palace of Dushanbe (Borbad Hall), Dushanbe.

In the capital of Kyrgyzstan, Bishkek, a number of examples of Soviet architecture can be seen. Founded as the State Republic Library in 1934, and later known by other names including V. I. Lenin State Library of the Kyrgyz SSR, this building is now known as the National Library of the Republic of Kyrgyzstan. The building features a flat roof and a symmetrical design utilising modern materials. Also in Bishkek is the National Museum of Kyrgyzstan, formerly known as the Lenin Museum. The building features a flat roof, symmetrical design and minimal ornamentation. Another example is The Bishkek White House that was constructed in 1985 as the Communist Party’s Central Committee’s Headquarters and contains the president’s office. The building features a flat roof and minimal ornamentation consistent with Soviet Modernism.

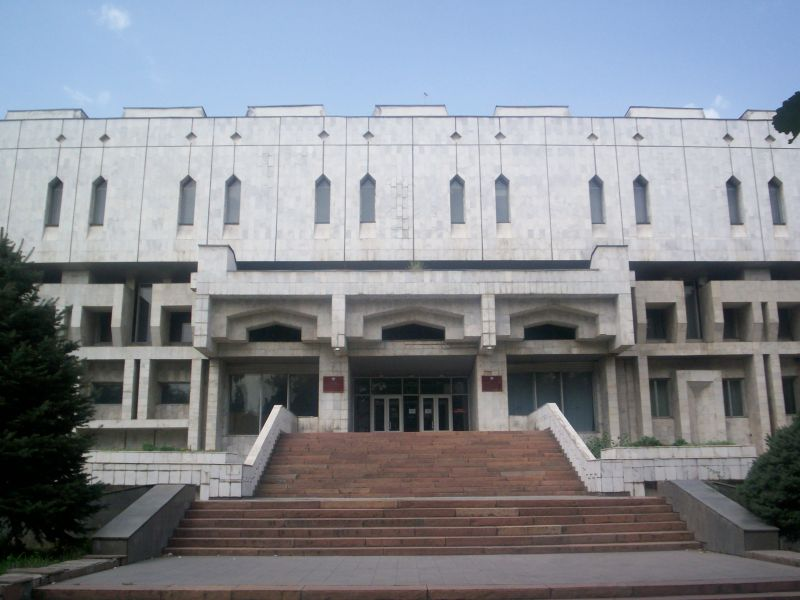
National Library of the Republic of Kyrgyzstan, Bishkek.

National Museum of Kyrgyzstan, Bishkek.

The Bishkek White House, Bishkek.

== Modern architecture ==
In Uzbekistan, Amir Timur has become the embodiment of Uzbek national identification. To celebrate his 660th birthday many Timurid monuments were restored in 1996. These projects were promoted by the government as a symbol of the nation's rising prosperity.

In Kazakhstan, a distinct architectural image is also being developed. In 1994, Astana became the new capital city, replacing Almaty. Almaty is home to numerous Soviet buildings such as the Al-Farabi Kazakh National University, the State Academic Russian Theatre for Children and Youth, and the Hotel Kazakhstan. In Astana, numerous modern buildings have been built. Buildings include the 62-metre-tall Palace of Peace and Reconciliation and the Khan Shatyr Entertainment Centre, the tallest tent in the world. Other modern buildings include the Baiterek Tower and the Hazrat Sultan Mosque, the largest mosque in Central Asia.

Khan Shatyr Entertainment Centre, Nur-Sultan, Kazakhstan.

Baiterek Tower, Nur-Sultan, Kazakhstan.

Hazrat Sultan Mosque, Nur-Sultan, Kazakhstan.

The same process can be seen in Dushanbe, the capital of Tajikistan. The city was known as Stalinabad from 1931 to 1961 after Joseph Stalin. The city’s Soviet-era building are being systematically knocked down and replaced by modern buildings. Dushanbe’s central post office has been razed to make way for a new skyscraper. Built in 2002, the Palace of Nations was constructed and is the official residence of Tajikistan’s President. In front of the Palace of Nations is the Dushanbe flagpole that at 165m, was the tallest in the world before this title was taken by the Jeddah Flagpole in Saudi Arabia. Officially opened in 2012, the National Library of Tajikistan is the largest library in Central Asia and has been constructed to look like an open book. The library is also near to the National Museum of Tajikistan, opened in 2011 by the President of Tajikistan and features 22 exhibition spaces with an area of more than 15,000 square metres. These buildings make up the “capitol complex”, which was moved from Rudaki Avenue (formerly known as Lenin Prospekt) intentionally, to a green area adjacent to the Dushanbinka River.

Palace of Nations, Dushanbe, Tajikistan.

Dushanbe Flagpole (and Palace of Nations), Dushanbe, Tajikistan.

National Library of Tajikistan, Dushanbe, Tajikistan.

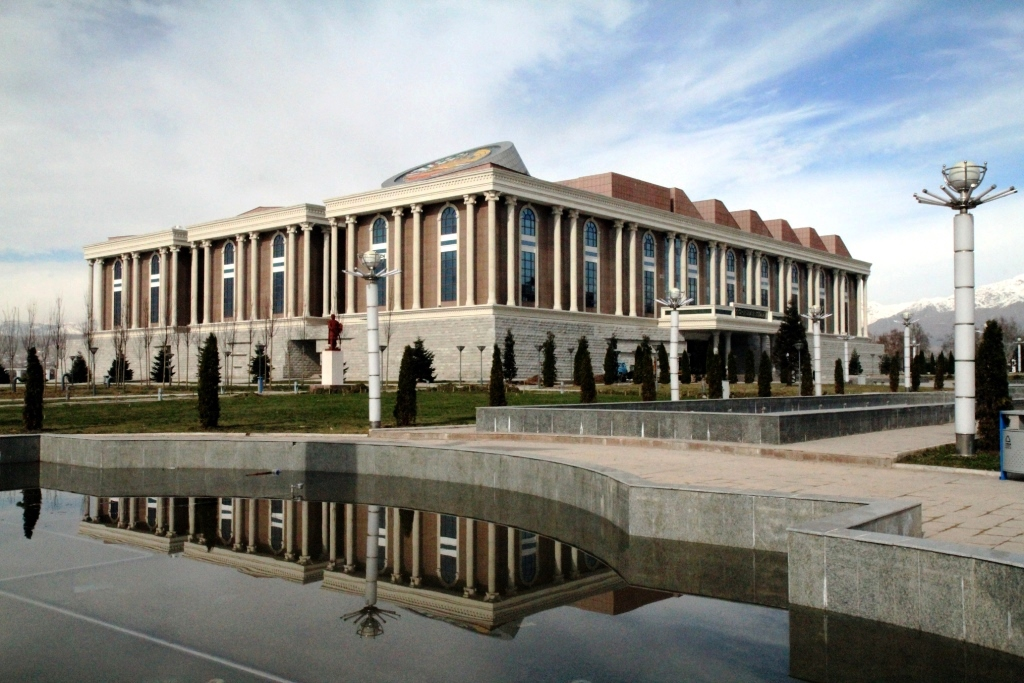
National Museum of Tajikistan, Dushanbe, Tajikistan.

In Kyrgyzstan, many of the Soviet-era buildings remain, despite the rebranding of ideologically significant buildings in order to symbolically reshape official city spaces. Previously known as the V. I. Lenin State Library of the Kyrgyz SSR, the library in Bishkek is now known as the National Library of the Republic of Kyrgyzstan. As aforementioned, the National Museum of Kyrgyzstan was formerly known as the Lenin Museum. Due to the country’s large gas reserves, Turkmenistan's capital of Ashgabat now holds the world record for the highest density of white marble-clad buildings in the world with 48,589,619 square feet of marble. Buildings include the city’s international airport terminal Ashgabat International Airport, opened in 2016 at a cost of $2.3 billion. At the city’s Wedding Palace, the building features a Turkmen star encapsulating an Earth displaying the country of Turkmenistan. Another marble structure in Ashgabat is the Monument of Neutrality, completed in 1998 to commemorate the president at the time, Saparmurat Niyazov. The structure is representative of Turkmenistan’s international neutrality.

Ashgabat International Airport, Ashgabat, Turkmenistan.

Wedding Palace, Ashgabat, Turkmenistan.

Monument of Neutrality, Ashgabat, Turkmenistan.

== See also ==
- List of tallest structures in Central Asia
- Central Asian art
