= Aisha Bibi =

Tomb in Taraz, Kazakhstan

Coordinates: 42°50′01″N 71°12′37″E

Aisha Bibi Mausoleum
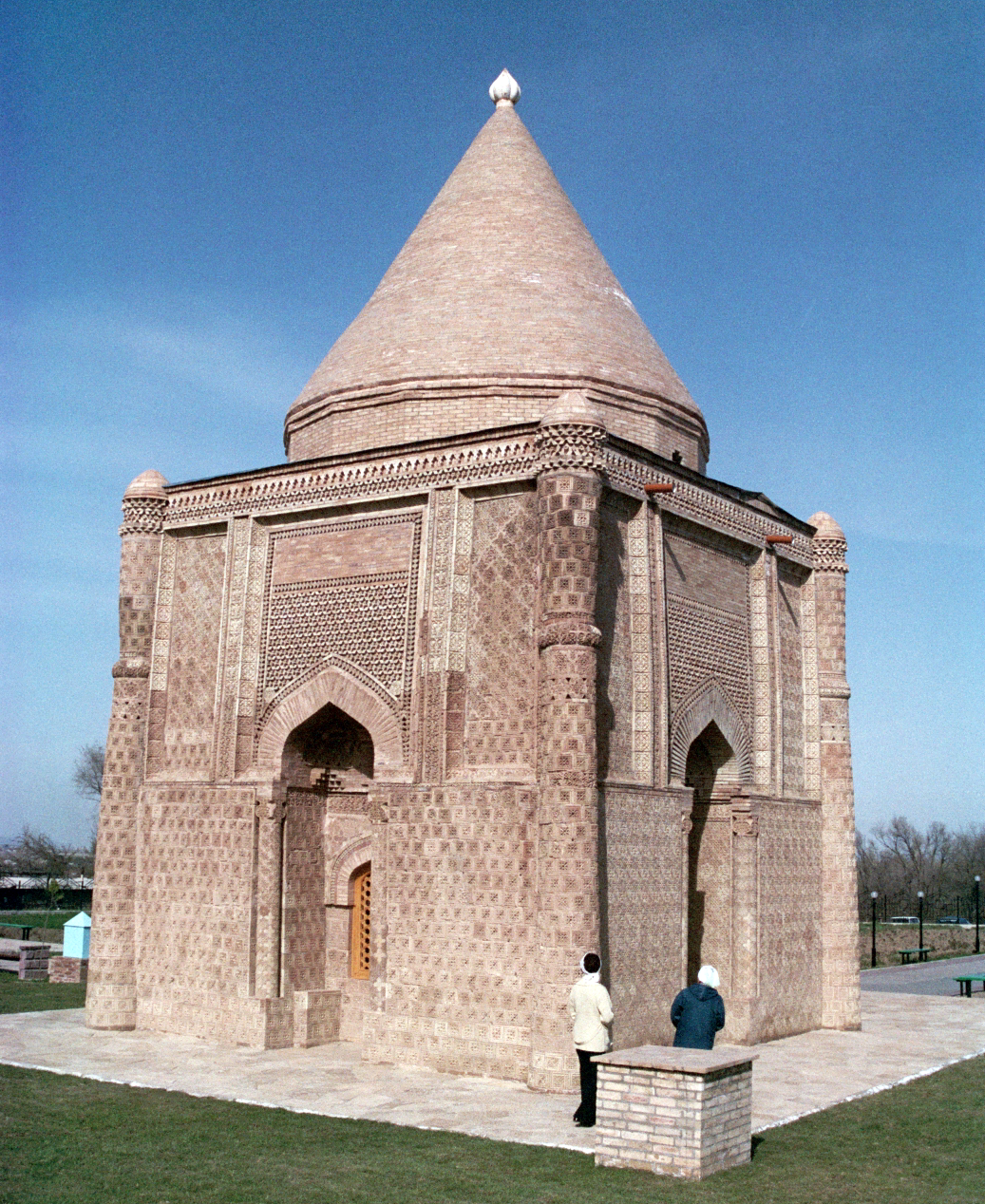
- the restored mausoleum of Aisha Bibi
- Interactive map of the Aisha Bibi Mausoleum area

General information
- Architectural style: Islamic
- Location: Aisha Bibi, Kazakhstan

The Aisha-Bibi (Kazakh: Айша бибі) is an 11th or 12th-century mausoleum for a noble woman located in the village of Aisha Bibi, 18 km (11 mi) west of Taraz, Kazakhstan on the Silk Road. It is locally famous as a monument to love and faithfulness.

== Design ==
According to legend, the mausoleum was built by a Karakhanid Dynasty ruler for his beautiful fiancée Aisha-Bibi, a daughter of Sufi poet Khakim-Ata. The mausoleum's architectural forms and decoration are reminiscent of fine lace. The whole building is covered with carved terracotta tiles using 60 different floral geometric patterns and stylized calligraphy. Aisha Bibi is a direct stylistic descendant of Samanid Mausoleum in Bukhara.

=== Site ===
Aisha Bibi is part of a larger complex. Ten meters away is a second mausoleum called Babaji Khatun ("wise queen"), and across the road is a sacred limestone cavern. Together with a garden area and parking lot they form the national monument. The complex is sited on a ridge overlooking the Taraz oasis from the west.

=== Typology ===
The entire mausoleum is covered with terracotta panels which help to create the illusion of masslessness typical in Islamic architecture. The terracotta decoration also uses light and shadow rather than color, a pre-Mongol style. Functionally, this type of decoration scatters the light so the viewer is not blinded as he might be from a smooth light colored wall in full sun. The Columns on the corner are shaped after wooden columns used extensively in Soghdian pre-Islamic architecture. There is a band of calligraphy at the point of constriction in each column. In general they describe the beauty of Aisha Bibi and of love in general. One of the old distichs reads: "Autumn... Clouds... The Earth is beautiful".

=== Materials ===
Sauran clay was used to make the bricks in both the original and restored Aisha Bibi.

== History ==
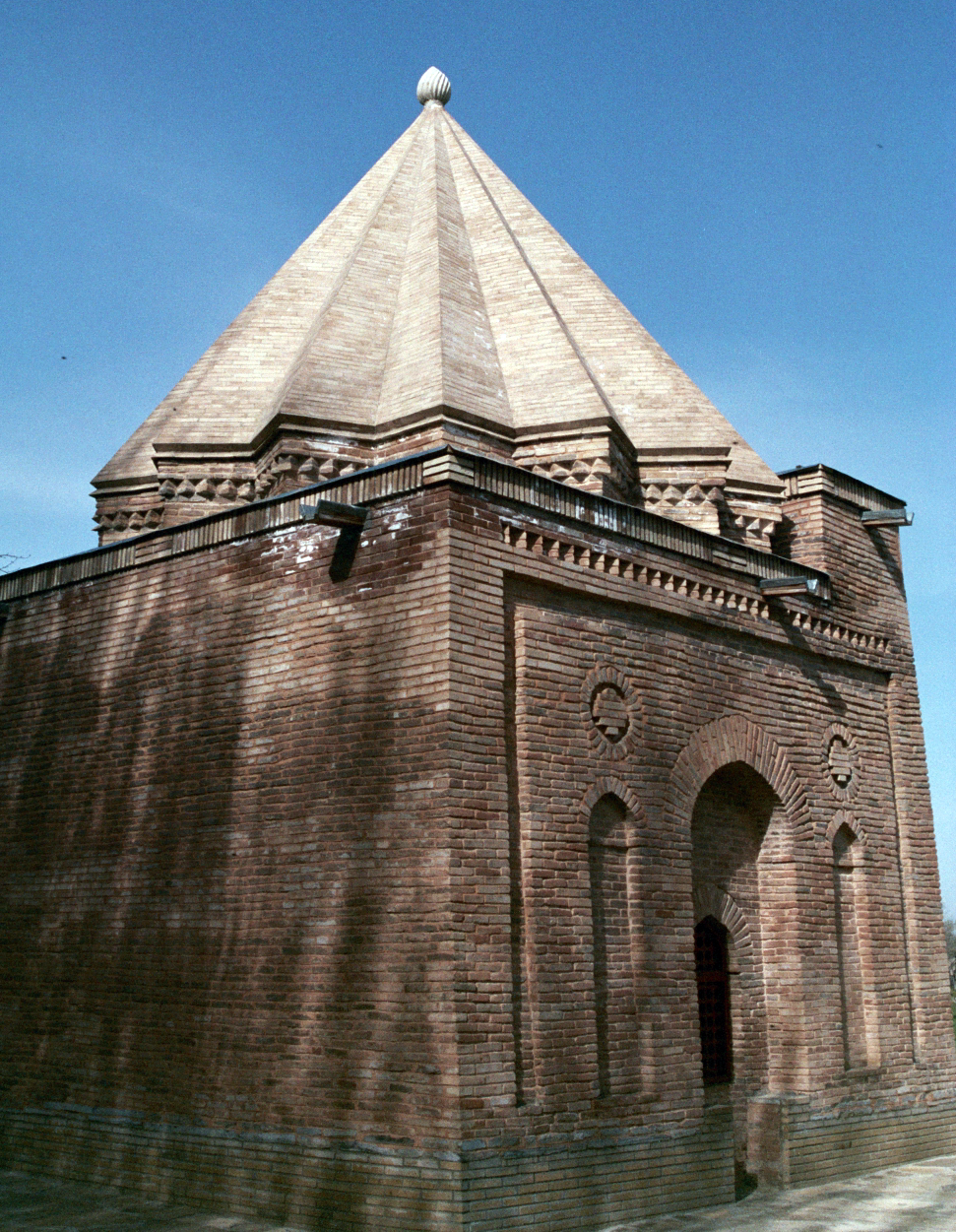
Mausoleum of Bibi Khanum adjacent to Aisha Bibi

The 16-year-old beauty, Aisha-bibi, was just an hour away from meeting her lover. She was in love with the Emir of Taraz and wanted to marry him, against the wishes of her father, so, she left her home Otrar with her wet nurse. Towards the end of their journey, the two women stopped at the shore of the Assa River to bathe. When she was emerging from the river, she reached for her clothes and was bitten by a snake that had slithered into her clothes, while she was in the water. The bite was fatal and she died soon after. The Emir was returning from a military mission to meet her but was too late. He ordered the construction of the tomb to commemorate her and their love for eternity.

— Oral History, as Recorded from a Kazakh of Taraz

According to another version, when Aisha felt the effects of the snake’s venom, she ordered that Karakhan be informed immediately. He came to her without delay, accompanied by his healers and mullahs. Seeing that the healers were powerless, Karakhan asked a mullah to perform a marriage rite with his dying bride. After the ceremony, taking the girl’s hand, he cried out loudly to her three times: “Aisha, you have now become bibi,” that is, his wife, a married woman.

According to Bayan Tujakbayeva, reports describe the death in 1034 of the daughter of the ruler of Talas, Bogra Khan, who died while traveling to Ghazna to join her fiancé Maudud, the heir of Mas‘ud. Tujakbayeva notes that this account corresponds with the local legend of a lady named Aisha-Bibi, who set out with her maidservant to meet her fiancé in a distant land and died on the journey.

=== Current use ===
The site has been venerated since the Middle Ages. Local women from the Taraz Oasis still pray for children and a happy family. It is customary for newlyweds in Taraz to have their union blessed by the dead lovers. Their ritual reenacts the myth. After the ceremony the wedding party retraces Karakhan's journey from Taraz to the site of his fiancée's death. The journey begins at Karakhan Mausoleum in Taraz and ends at the Aisha Bibi, at each location the bride and groom venerate the dead lovers and ask for their blessing.

Russian archeologist V. V. Bartold was the first scientist to record and study the ruins in 1893. The Soviet Union built a protective glass shell to preserve the monument (c 1960) and used it for the education of students in Taraz and tourism. In 2002, the Republic of Kazakhstan paid Nishan Rameto to restore the Aisha Bibi and built the park infrastructure around it. Shoqan Walikhanov painted monument in his work in 1856.

== Images ==
Aisha Bibi Details

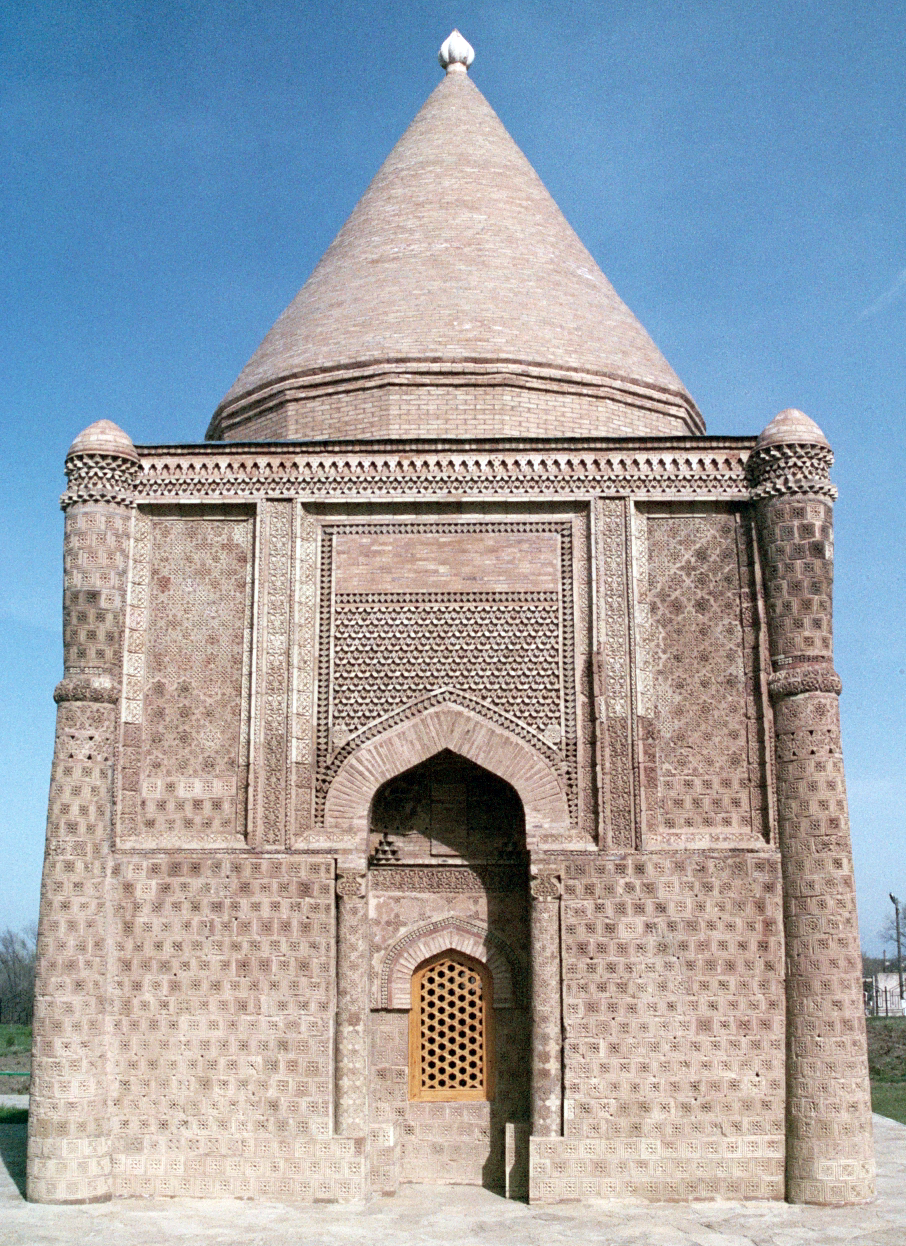
Elevation

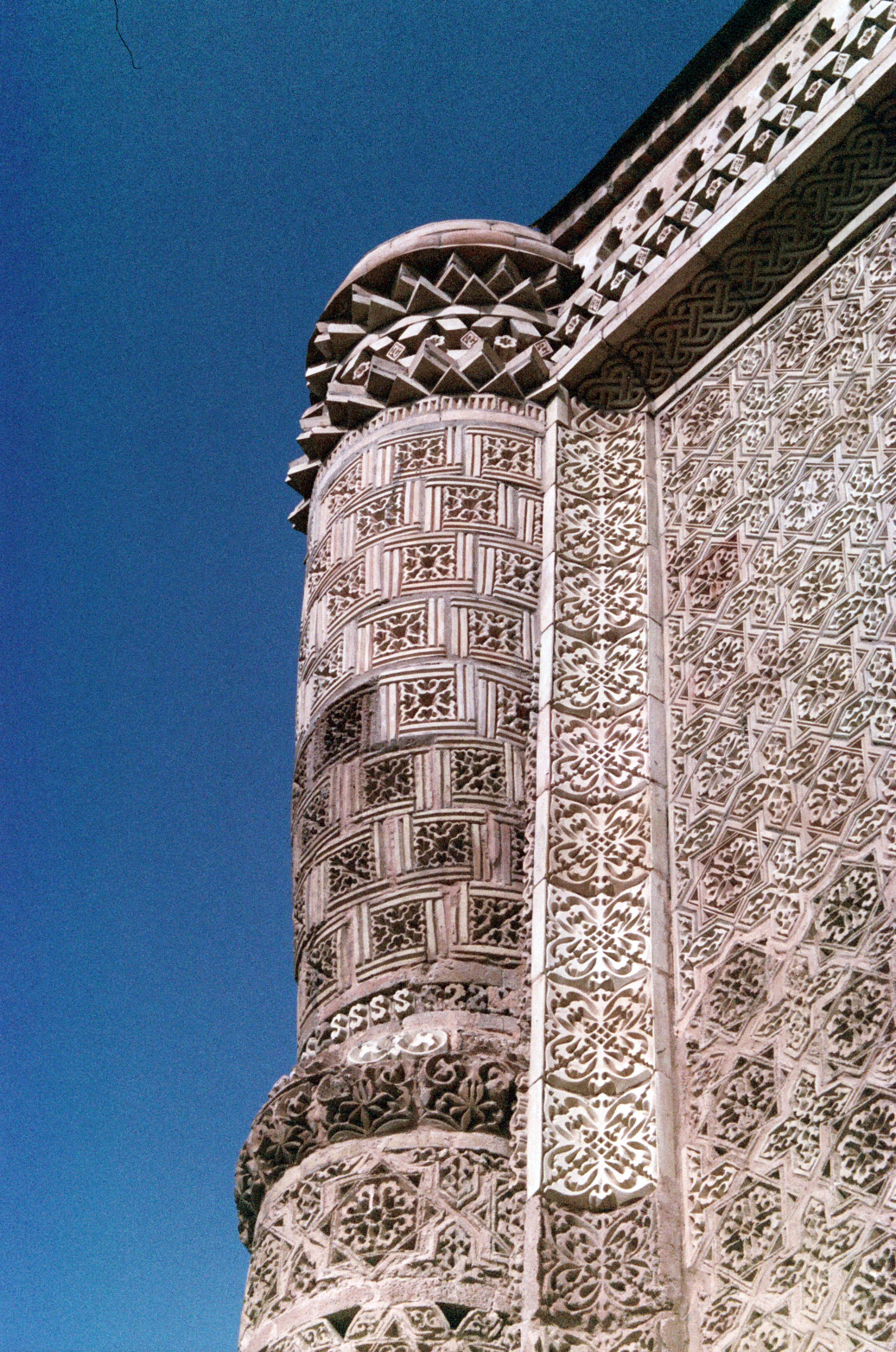
Corner Column

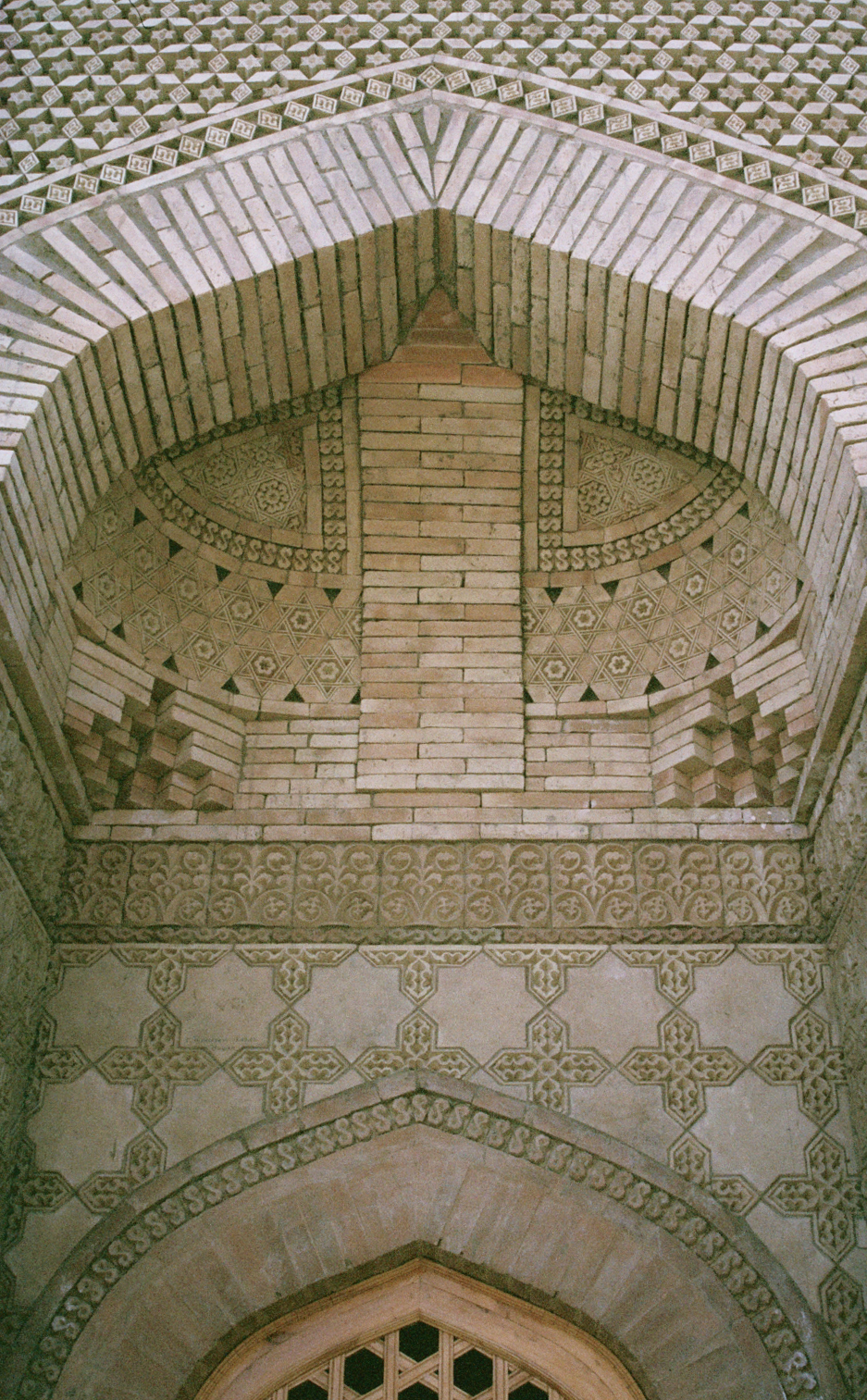
Two-Center Arch

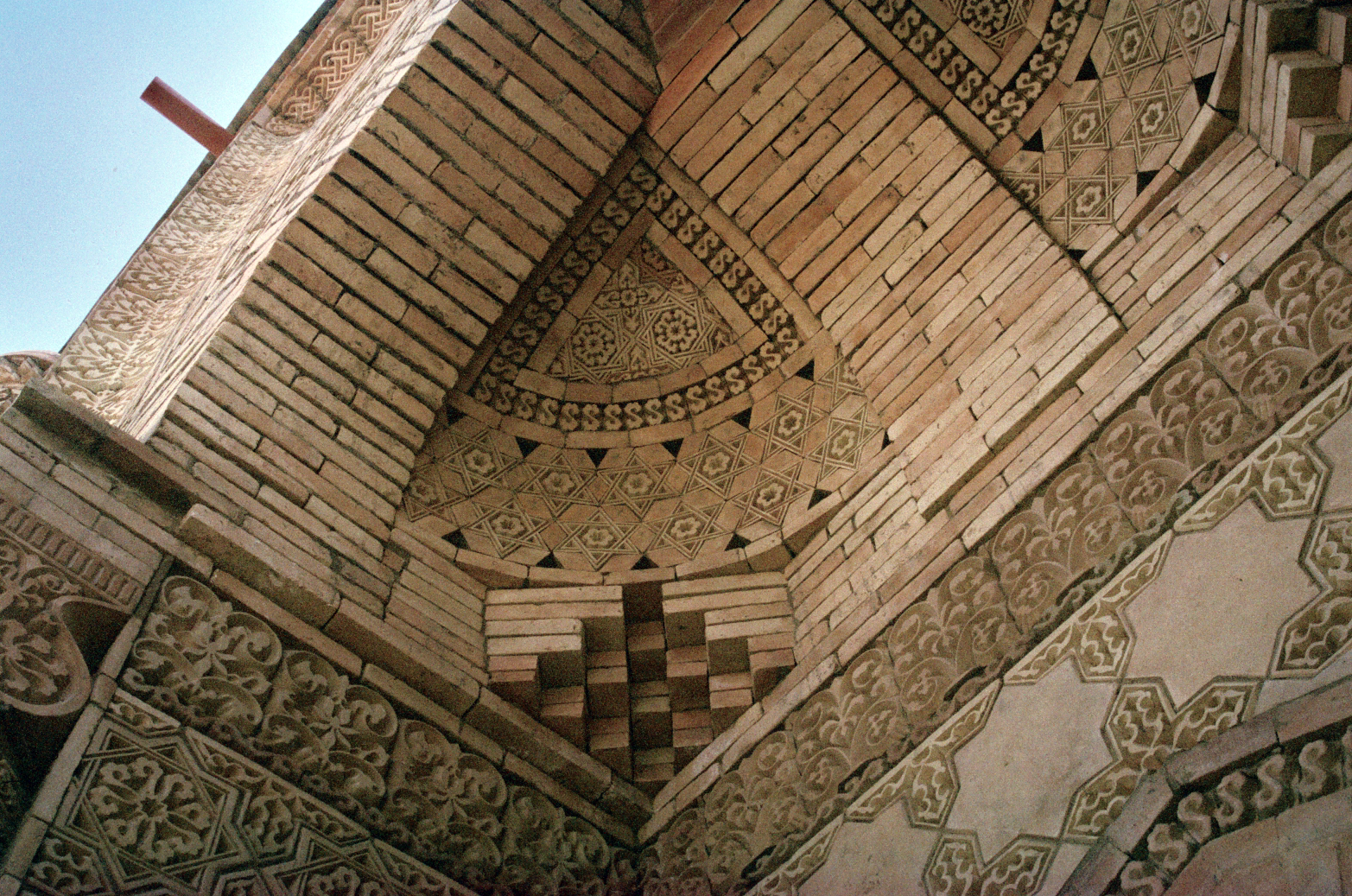
Detail of Squinch

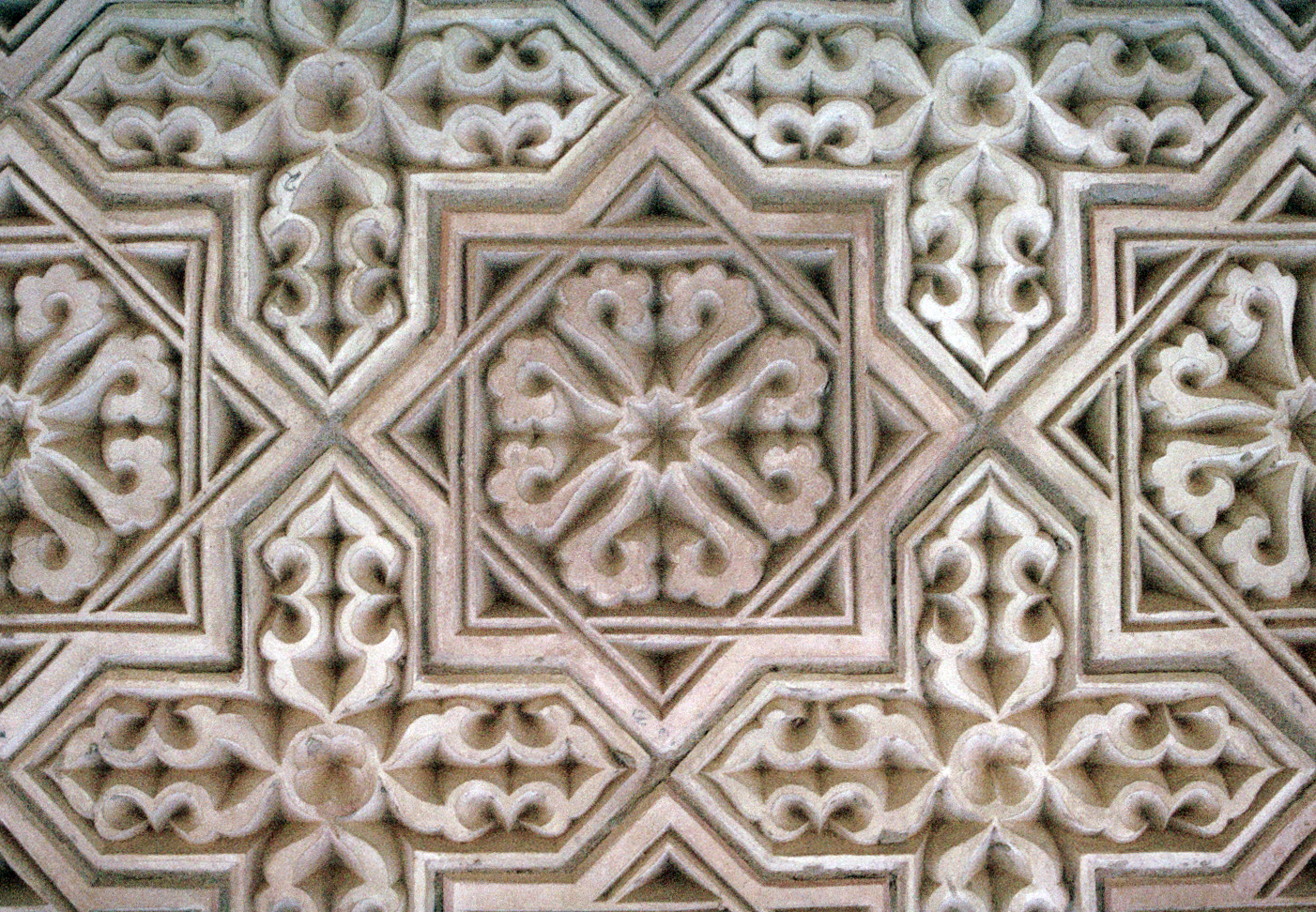
Facade Tile

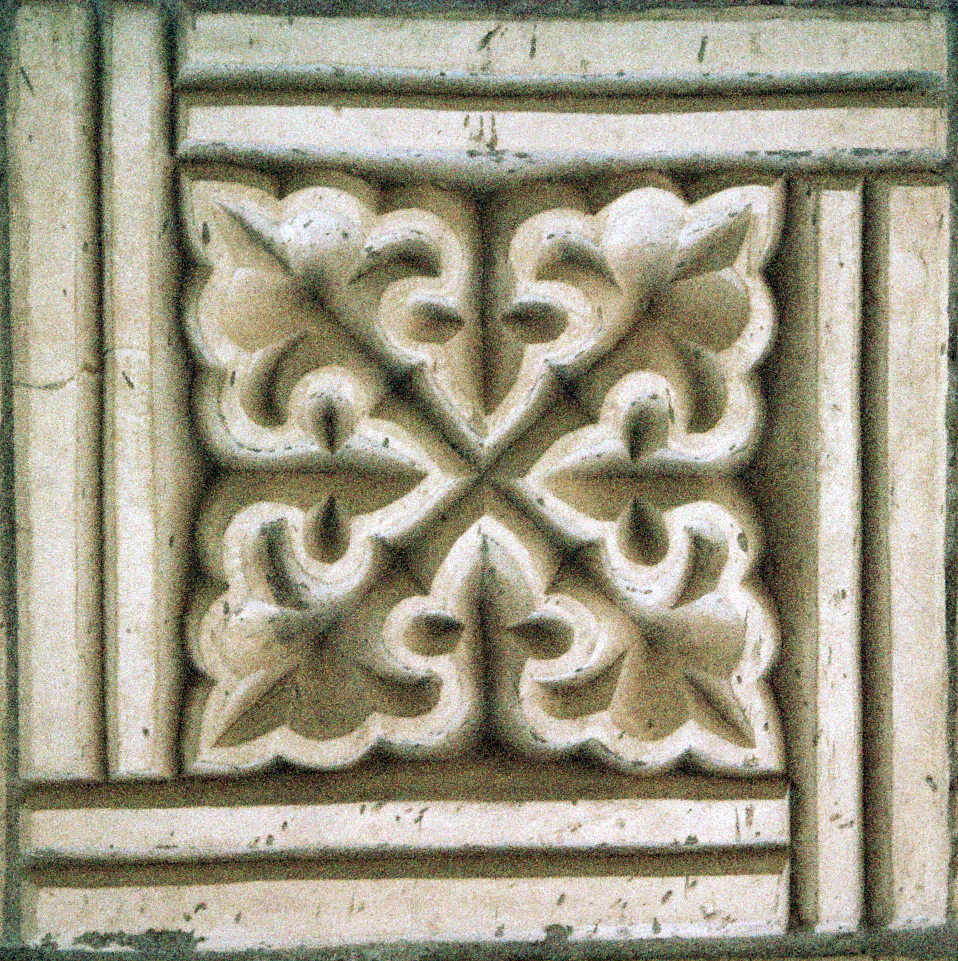
Column Tile

Plan 1m=20mm

== See also ==
- Samanid mausoleum
