= Samanid Mausoleum =

Mausoleum in Bukhara, Uzbekistan

Coordinates: 39°46′37″N 64°24′02″E

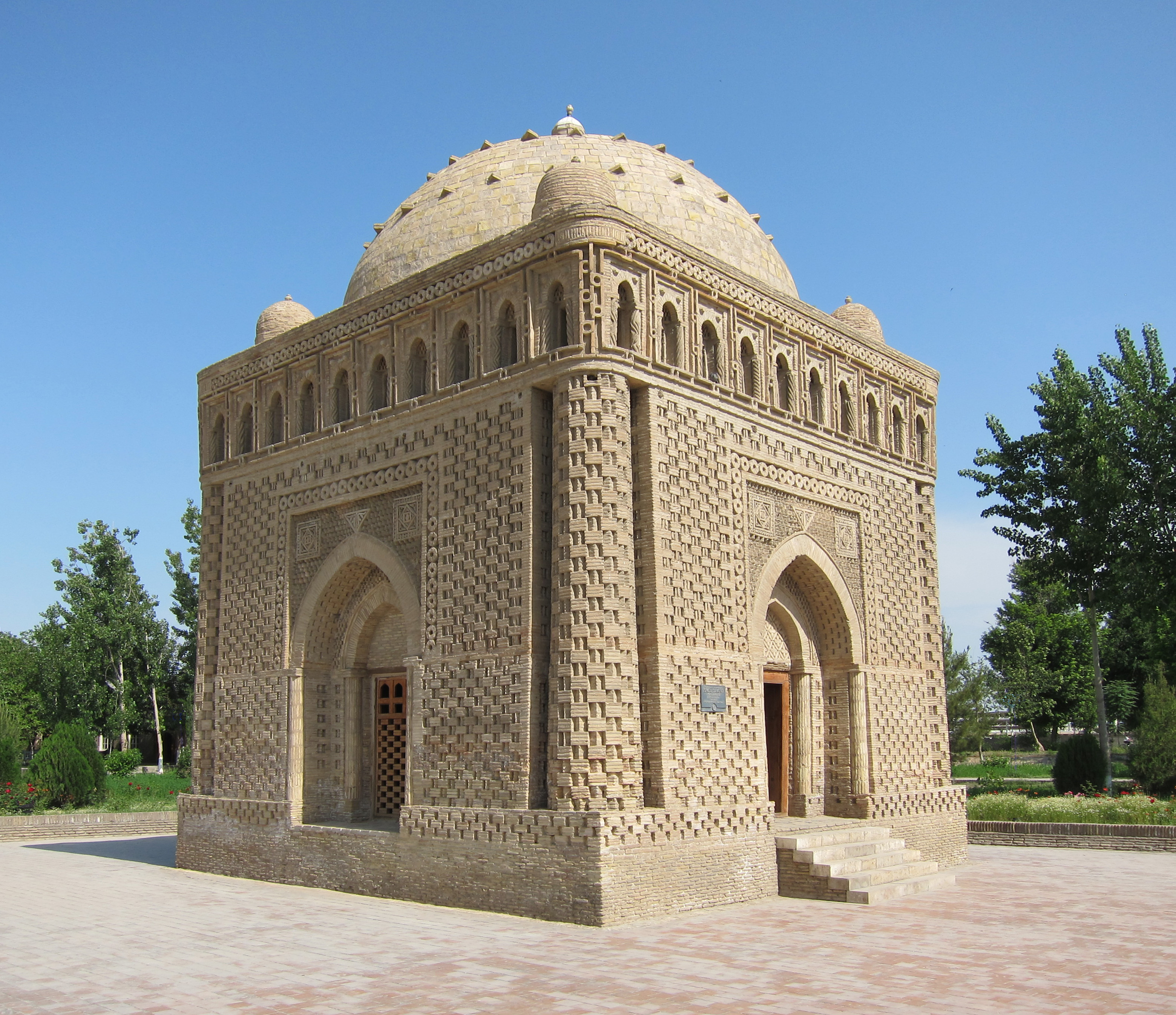
General view of the mausoleum

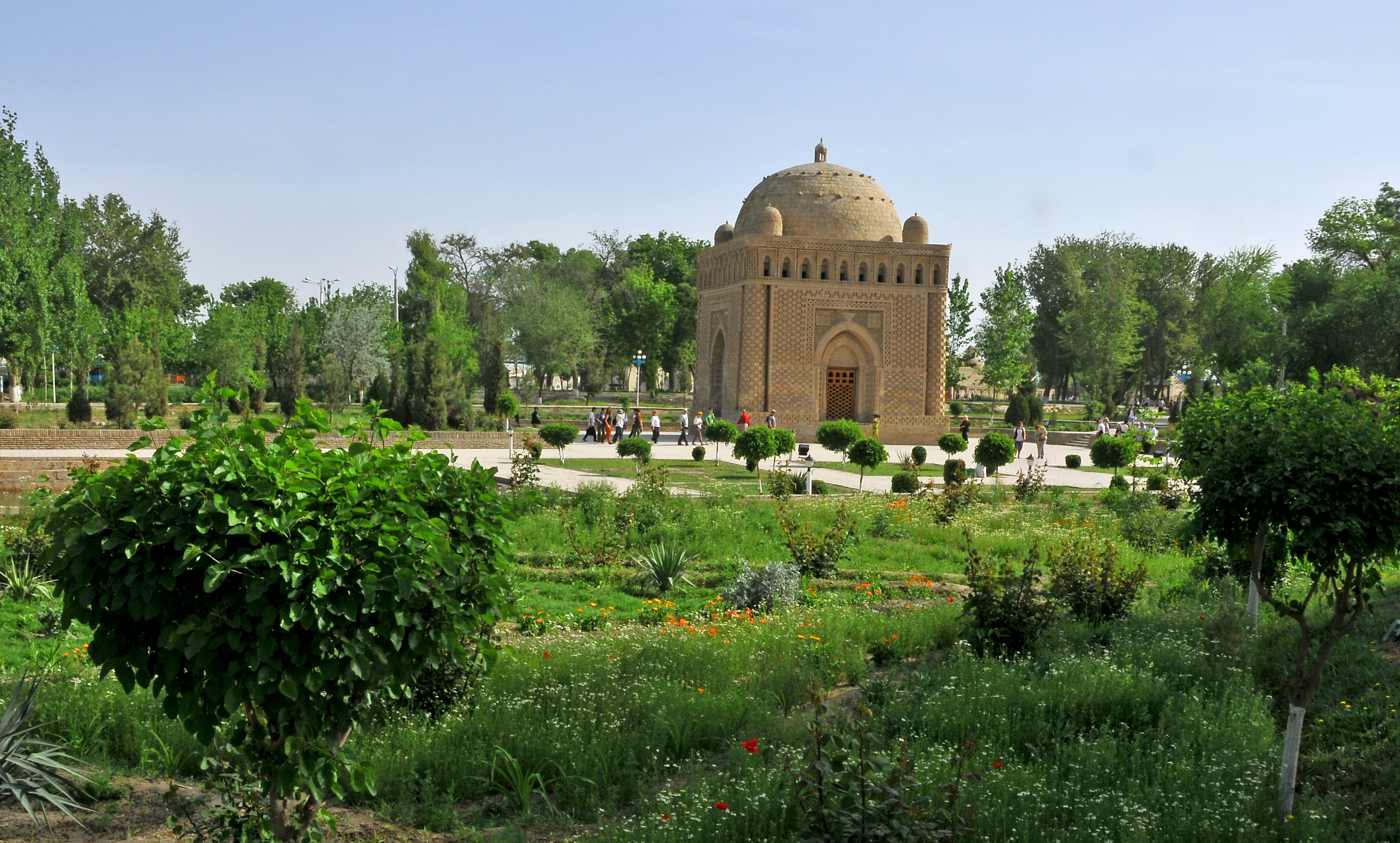
Exterior view of the mausoleum

The Samanid Mausoleum (Uzbek: Ismoil Samoniy Maqbarsi) is a mausoleum located in the northwestern part of Bukhara, Uzbekistan, just outside its historic center. It was built in the 10th century CE as the resting place of the powerful and influential Islamic Samanid dynasty that ruled the Samanid Empire from approximately 900 to 1000. It contained three burials, one of whom is known to have been that of Nasr II.

The mausoleum is considered one of the iconic examples of early Islamic architecture and is known as the oldest funerary building of Central Asian architecture. The Samanids established their de facto independence from the Abbasid Caliphate in Baghdad and ruled over parts of modern Afghanistan, Iran, Uzbekistan, Tajikistan, and Kazakhstan. It is the only surviving monument from the Samanid era, but American art historian Arthur Upham Pope called it "one of the finest in Persia".

Perfectly symmetrical, compact in size, yet monumental in its structure, the mausoleum not only combined multi-cultural building and decorative traditions, such as Sogdian, Sassanian, Persian and even classical and Byzantine architecture, but incorporated features customary for Islamic architecture – a circular dome and mini domes, pointed arches, elaborate portals, columns and intricate geometric designs in the brickwork. At each corner, the mausoleum's builders employed squinches, an architectural solution to the problem of supporting the circular-plan dome on a square. The building was buried in silt some centuries after its construction and was revealed during the 20th century by archaeological excavation conducted under the USSR.

== History ==
During the 10th century, Samanids' capital, Bukhara, was a major political, trade and cultural center that patronized science, architecture, medicine, arts and literature. Cultural and economic prosperity was fueled by Samanids' strategic positioning along the trade routes between Asia, Middle East, Russia and Europe. It is believed that the Mausoleum was built to emphasize the dynastic power of the Samani family and to link its history with their newly established capital.

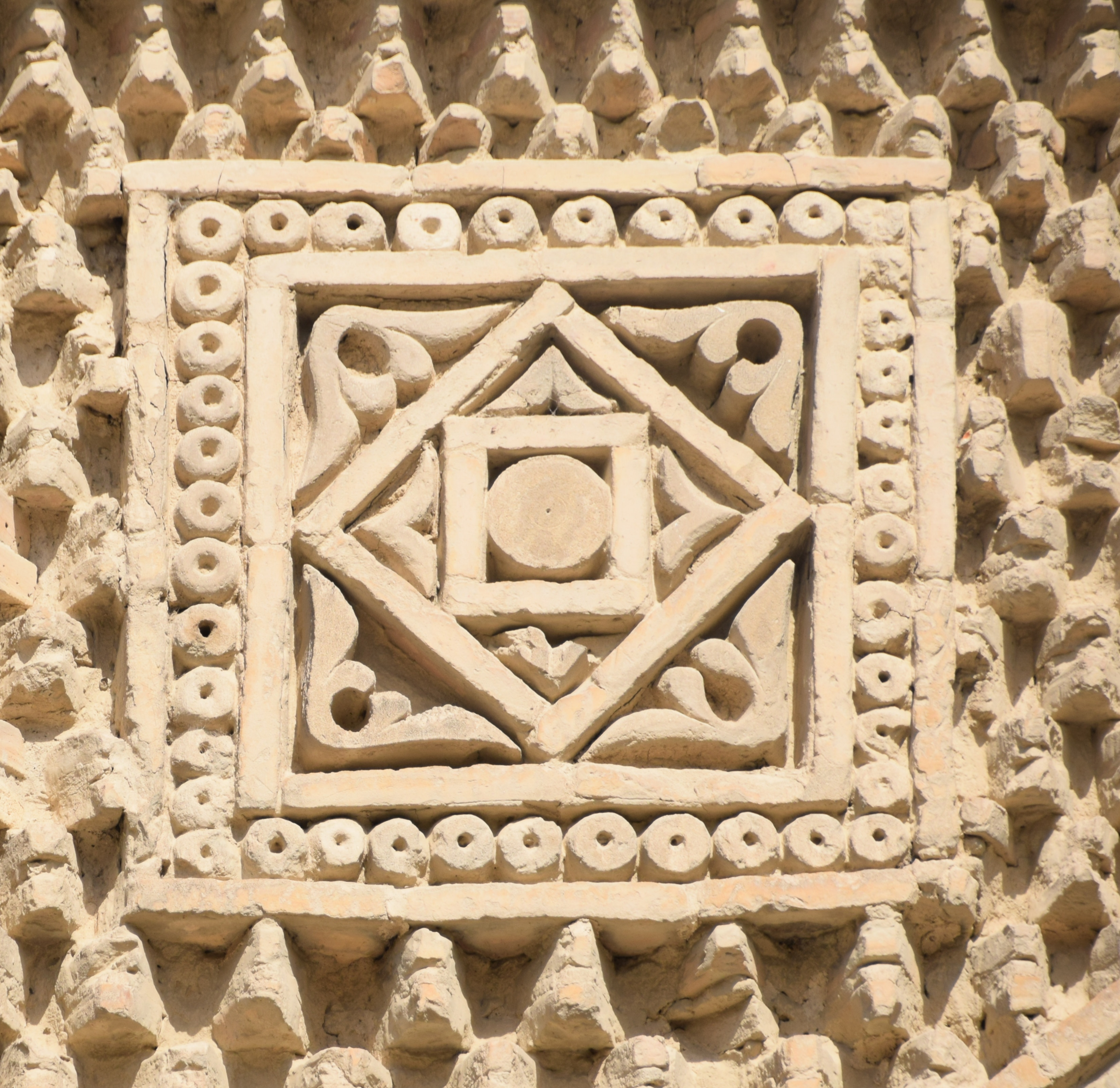
Symbols over the entrance to the Mausoleum of Isma‘il Samani, Bukhara, 9th – 10th centuries CE.

There are various estimates by the researchers of when the Mausoleum was built. Some attribute it to the reign of Ismail Samani (r. 892–907 CE), a founder of the dynasty (b. 849), some reference Ismail's father, Ahmad, who governed Samarkand. Others attribute the building to the reign of Ismail's grandson, Nasr II who ruled (r. 914–943 CE). The reason for this later attribution is the lintel with inscribed Kufic script with his name found on the eastern side of the building during the restoration works in the 1930s.

In 1930s, Soviet researchers discovered a copy of a 10th-century waqf document (copied around 1568) that specified that Ismail Samani donated Bukhara's cemetery Naukanda land for what appears to read as a funerary building for his father, Ahmad, confirming earlier assumptions of a dynastic nature of the monument. Before the time of Genghis Khan's siege and sack of Bukhara in 1220, the mausoleum is believed to have been buried in mud and sand from flooding and landslides, remaining so for centuries. Thus, when the Mongol armies reached Bukhara, the tomb was spared from their destruction, unlike most other buildings of that era. For the same reasons, the building was not known to the world until the early 20th century when archaeologists rediscovered it.

Major exploratory research and excavations took place during 1926–1928 by a Soviet team of architects and researchers. During 1937–1939, the Mausoleum was further studied and major restorations works took place under the leadership of B. N. Zasipkin. Graves of three male bodies have been discovered. One of these is identified as Nasr II from the inscription on the lintel; the identity of the other two is not known. During the Soviet era, some time after World War II, the cemetery that surrounded the Mausoleum was paved over, and an amusement park (still in operation) was built next to and around the building.

Within the city walls and in the immediate vicinity of the historical center of Bukhara there are architectural monuments of a thousand years old, the oldest of which is the Samanid mausoleum.

The erection of memorial mausoleums at first categorically contradicted some of the norms of Islam, but this prohibition was first violated by the "permitted" construction of the first Muslim mausoleum Kubba as-Sulabiya over the tomb of the Arab caliph al-Muntasir (861-862), in which two other caliphs were later buried: al-Mu'tazz (866-869) and al-Muhtadi (869-870), after which the erection of mausoleums began in all the Islamized countries of the Middle and Near East that were part of the Arab Caliphate. The mausoleum of the Samanids, a dynasty of Transoxiana rulers, was no exception.

During the Middle Ages, this and other mausoleums that have not survived to this day were located within the large necropolis of the Samanid dynasty. With the fall of the dynasty (999) the area of the necropolis was gradually reduced, the mausoleums were destroyed, and in the XVI-XVIII centuries on its territory began to build urban residential neighborhoods. In the early Middle Ages the area of the necropolis was called Naukanda, later Chahar-gumbazan (four domes), and in the late Middle Ages Bahadur-biy, and the Samanid mausoleum was considered the mazar of Ismail Samani.

The mausoleum was first explored in 1924 by the expedition of Moisei Yakovlevich Ginzburg. At the same time the plan of the building was taken. In 1925, the scientific secretary of the Bukhara Commission for the Protection of Monuments of Antiquity and Art Musa Saidjanov organized the restoration of the facing of the dome of the building. During further archaeological research - excavations of Vasiliy Vyatkin, conducted in 1926-1928, it was found out that inside the necropolis there were several burials, including Ismail Samani himself. At the same time it was found out that the necropolis building stands on the ruins of an even older one, probably somehow connected with the solar myths. In 1928-1930, partial restoration of the mausoleum was carried out by P. S. Kasatkin and N. M. Bachinskiy.

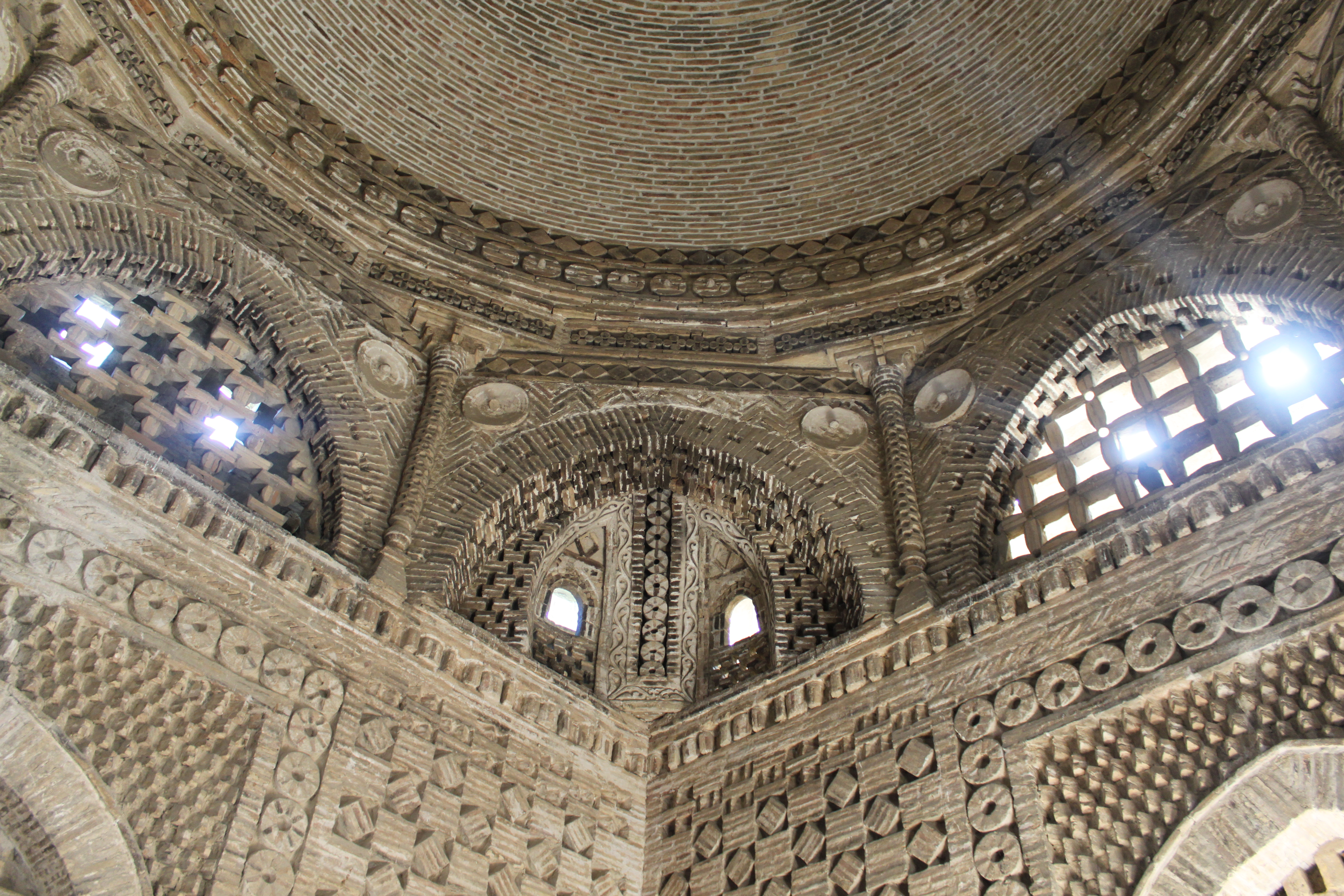
Interior detail with squinch

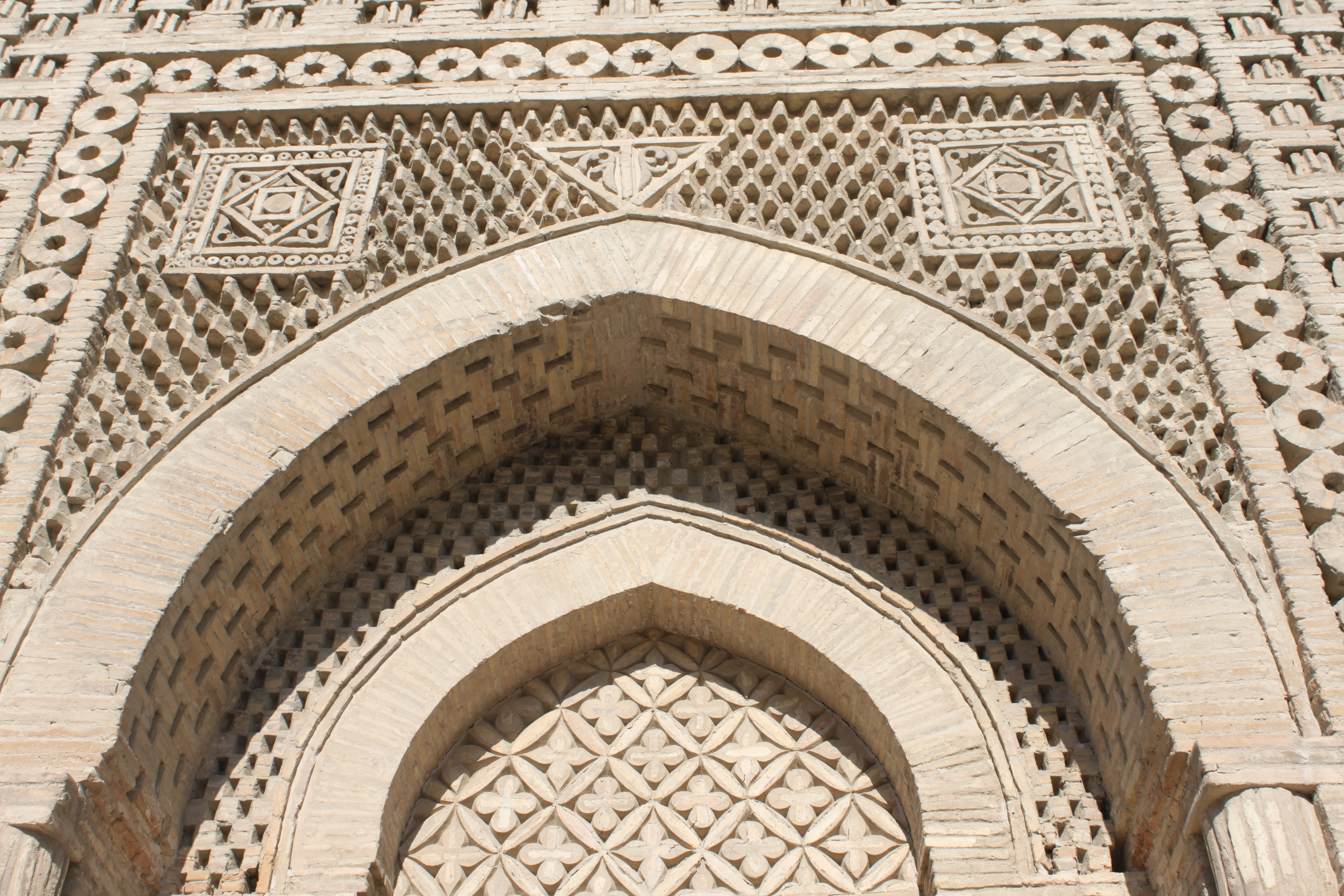
Exterior detail with pointed arches and spandrels

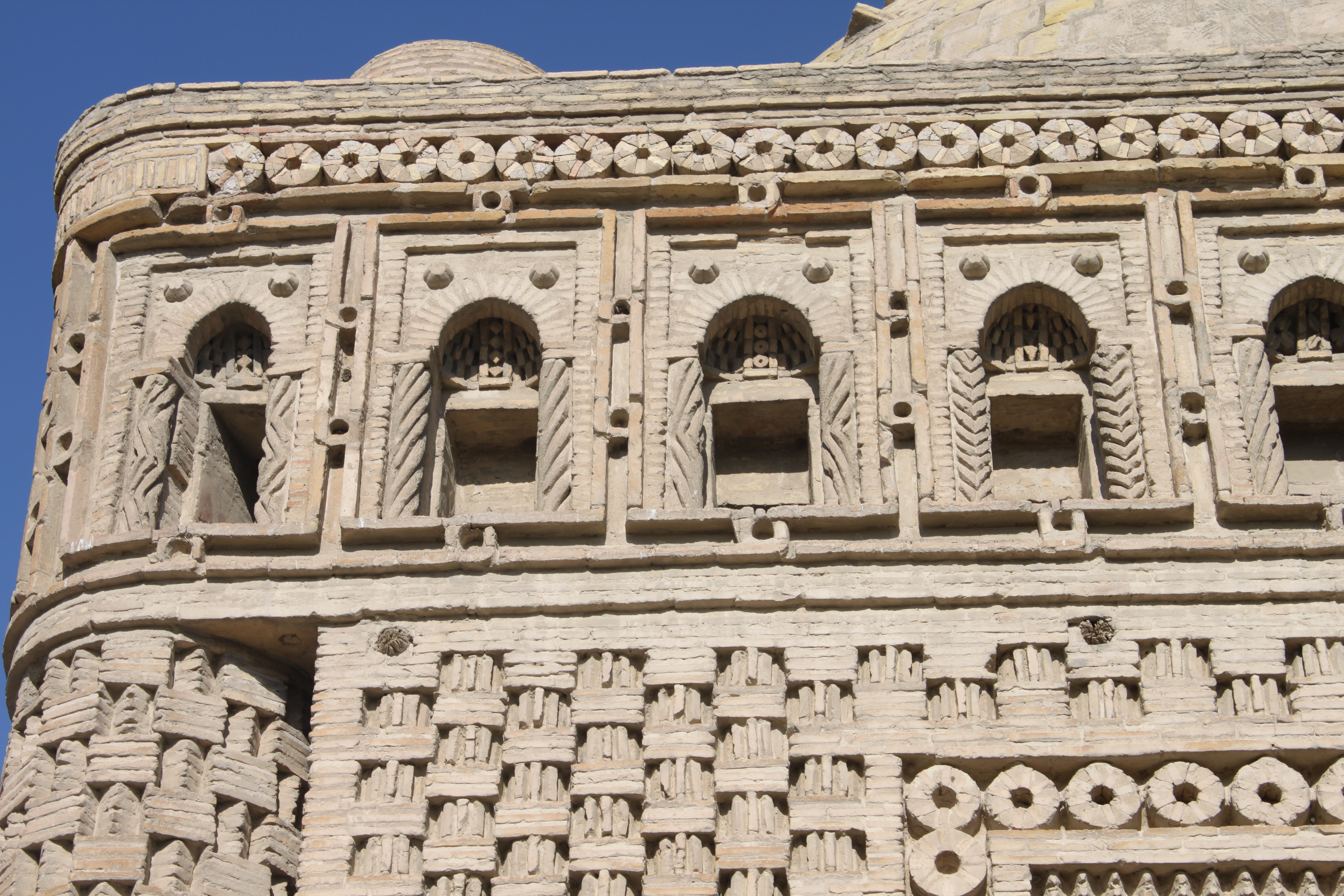
Exterior brickwork with blind arcade

== Architecture ==
The monument marks a new era in the development of Persian and Central Asian architecture, which was revived after the Arab conquest of the region. Many researches noted that the structure is made similar to the open, four-arched, often square in shape, Zoroastrian fire temples from Sassanian Iran, commonly known as chahar taq in Persian – a reference to Samanids claim of Sassanian descent. The building's shape is cuboid, like the Kaaba structure of the Great Mosque of Mecca in Saudi Arabia, while heavy fortress-like corner buttresses are derived from Sogdian traditions of Central Asia. The synthetic style of the tomb is reflective of the 9th and 10th centuries – a time when the region still had large populations of Zoroastrians in their early stages of conversion to Islam. Elaborate baked brick decoration is unique in its level of detail and rhythmic patterns and combines multi-cultural decorative motifs (Sogdian, Sassanian, Persian, Arabic, Antique). However, the building architects went beyond simply appropriating existing traditions in building structure and decoration; they introduced new features symbolic for the monumental dynastic architecture. In its structure, Mausoleum's unknown architects used squinches, containing four interior arches and an octagonal structure, that allowed to redistribute the weight of the circular dome over a square base, an alternative to pendentives.

Overall, the building is constructed in a form of a small, slightly tapering cube, with each side approximately 31 feet (9.4 m) long. There are four identically designed facades which gently slope inwards with increasing height. Wall thickness of approximately 6 feet (1.8 m) at the base of the building assured structural solidity and survival through the ages. Each side has an entrance portal adorned with pointed arches. Many researches note well-studied, almost mathematical, proportions of the building and its harmonious hierarchy. The base of the building is heavy which is accentuated by a wider foundation; four heavy built in three-quarter corner columns, classical in design, contribute to its fortress-like appearance. The top of the building is lightened up through an elegant arcade gallery, placed below the cornice, that have many arched openings to reduce overall weight and to let light inside the building (in contrast, most of chahar taq structures had no windows). A large semi-circular Dome, about 23 ft (7 meters) in diameter crowns the structure and it is similar to the Buddhist domes in the area. Four mini domes placed in the corners of the roof are more decorative in nature. Overall, the mausoleum's builders achieved an elegant hierarchy of diminishing proportions and vertical perspective through the diminishing size of the domes (one large and four small), columns (placed in the corners, portals and gallery) and arches (portals and gallery). Typical for Islamic architecture in general, there is an overlap and ambiguity between the structural and decorative features within the building – bricks being structure and décor, both equally important.

Builders used baked brick of various rectangular and square sizes for both structural and decorative elements of the building. Large bricks formed large bands throughout the building for structural stability, smaller bricks were used for decoration, usually in blocks of two to five bricks. Baked brick was a known material in the region, yet such extensive and creative use is considered unprecedented. Local builders mostly used unbaked brick, stucco and wood as these materials were cheaper, but not as strong as baked brick. The Mausoleum uses a few stucco and wood elements but these are minimal in terms of their relative share in the construction process. A few bounding compounds were discovered during the excavations, alabaster being one of them. It is interesting that due to Islamic restrictions on use of imagery, Samanid Mausoleum decoration in mostly geometric in its layout and patterns, in comparison with the pre-Islamic Central Asian building traditions that blended architecture, sculpture and painting. Researchers found common elements between the Samanid Mausoleum décor and design patterns executed in wood from the 8th century Penjikent.

Repeated patterns create calculated harmony and a sense of infinity, important for a funerary structure. Patterns of great variety, executed in baked brick include basketweave, checkerboard, "dog tooth" ornament (on spandrels and the main dome), borders of rosettes, floral ornaments, ribbons, and bands of pearls. There is a notable consistency between the exterior and interior decor in terms of patterns, materials and approach and this signifies that the construction was most likely performed by the same person or team. Repeat pattern of decor and general symmetry were helpful during the restoration works in 1930s as archaeologists used surviving elements to restore those that had been lost. Careful studies of the type of materials, mortar, patterns, thickness and forms of historic layers were conducted before the restoration works began. Prior to renovations, most of the damage was located at the gallery level. Some time during the 20th century, metal screens were installed within the portals to restrict access to the building. It is not known if the original portals had any screens installed.

== Significance ==
The fact that the religious law of orthodox Sunni Islam strictly prohibits the construction of mausoleums over burial places stresses the significance of the Samanid mausoleum, which is the oldest surviving monument of Islamic architecture in Central Asia and the sole monument that survived from the era of the Samanid dynasty. The Samanid Mausoleum might be one of the earliest departures from that religious restriction in the history of Islamic architecture.

The building is regarded as one of the oldest monuments in the Bukhara region. Samanid Mausoleum appears in virtually every survey on the Islamic architecture and is significant as an example of early Islamic architecture in the Central Asia and worldwide. Its unknown creators harmoniously combined references to the prior regional traditions and deployed innovative structural elements, such as squinches, as well as new for the time features that are considered customary for the Islamic architecture worldwide. Samanid Mausoleum is sometimes referred to as a "Jewel Box" due to its compact size and elegant, mathematically calculated proportions and rhythmic patterns of its intricate, unprecedented baked brick decoration.

The mausoleum of Pakistan's founding father, Muhammad Ali Jinnah–Mazar-e-Quaid in Karachi is modeled after the Samanid Mausoleum.

== Signs and symbols on the walls of the mausoleum ==
Uzbek scholar Sh. S. Kamoliddin has presented compelling evidence of the Buddhist origin of this project. The symbols on the walls of the Samanid mausoleum form a complex geometric composition, consisting of embedded squares and a central circle, which are a specific type of Buddhist-Manichaean mandala and can be considered as symbols of Buddhism. It is believed that the overall layout of the mausoleum, when viewed from above, is an exact reproduction of a Buddhist-Manichaean mandala.

== Folk stories and legends ==
According to legend, Ismail Samani, known to the people of Bukhara as Hazrat Sultan, continued to rule the country even after his death. People seemed to genuinely believe in this legend because long after his death, they would still lower written requests through an opening on the southern side of the mausoleum, hoping to receive a response on the following day. Supposedly, the response would appear on the northern side of the mausoleum. According to another legend, Ismail Samani later relinquished his rule after two visitors attempted to deceive him in the mausoleum. However, until the early 20th century, a superstition persisted that if you wrote a plea for mercy and placed it at the foot of the grave, your request would be granted, and the response, if made by a righteous person with genuine faith, could be received in written form.

== See also ==
- Lyab-i Hauz
- Po-i-Kalyan
- Tourism in Uzbekistan
- Persian domes
