= Khoja Ahrar Complex =

Islamic religious complex in Samarkand, Uzbekistan

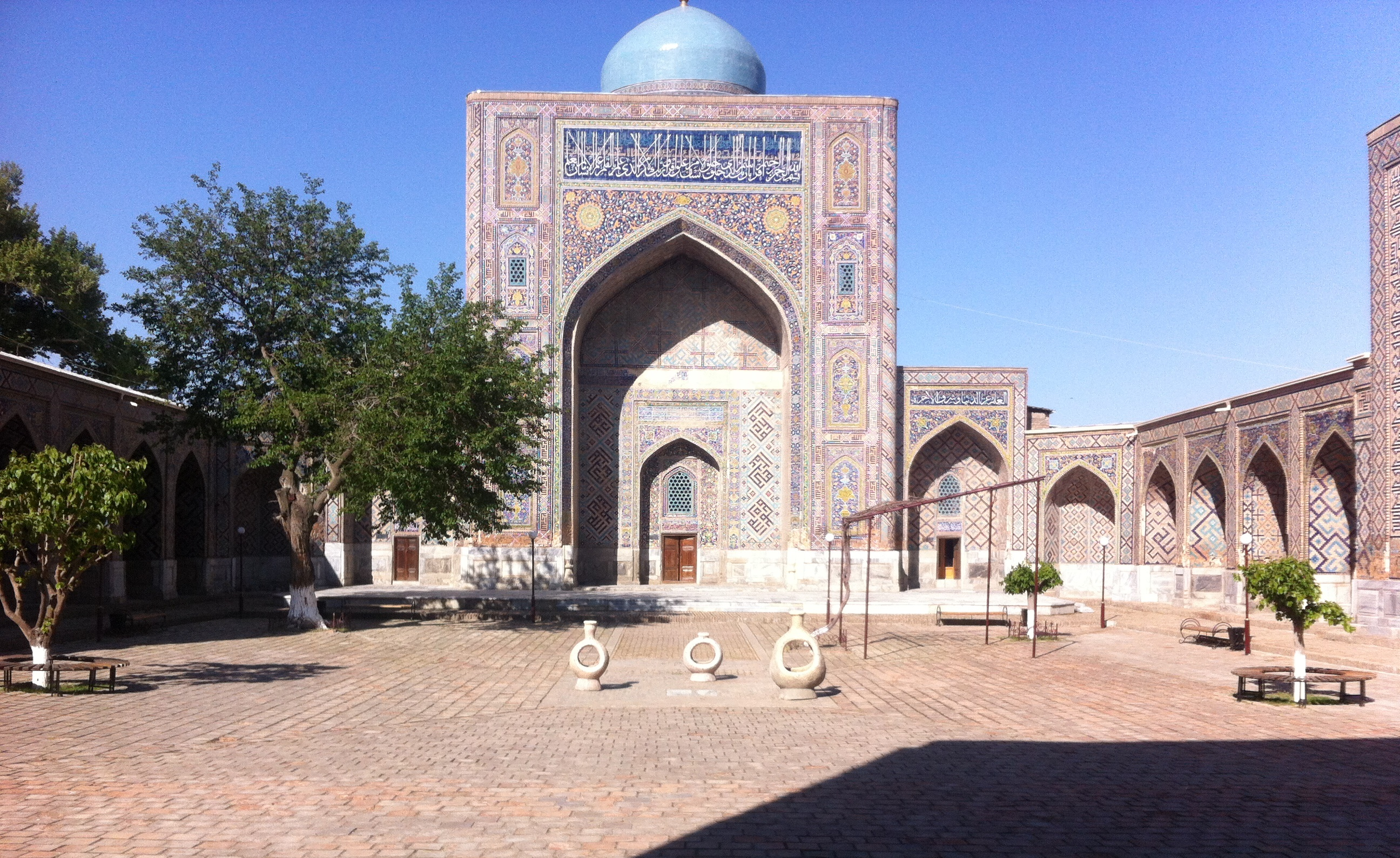
- A view from inside the courtyard of the madrasa established by Nadir Devonbegi.
- Interactive map of Khoja Ahrar Complex
- Type: Islamic religious complex consisting of a mosque, madrasa and tombs.
- Location: Samarkand, Uzbekistan
- Coordinates: 39°37′07″N 66°57′13″E
- Built: 1635–1636
- Architectural style: Timurid architecture

The Khoja Ahrar Complex (Uzbek: Xoja Ahror majmuasi, Russian: Ансамбль Ходжа-Ахрар, Arabic: مجمع خواجة أحرار; also spelled as Khodja Akhror) is an Islamic religious complex located in the Ulugbek district in Samarkand, Uzbekistan. It is made up of a mosque, madrasa and the tomb of Khwaja Ahrar, a 15th-century Muslim statesman. The present-day complex dates back to the 17th century and was built during the rule of the Astrakhan Khanate.

== History ==
Originally, the site was where a khanqah established by the 15th-century ascetic Khwaja Ahrar was situated. Khwaja Ahrar, whose real name was Nasir ad-Din ibn Mahmoud Shashi, was a leader of the Naqshbandi order as well as a very prominent statesman of Samarkand during a time of instability under the reign of Sultan Ahmed Mirza. When the famed scholar died in the 1490s, he was buried behind his khanqah and his grave became an important site for locals to visit. Years later, in 1630, Nodir Mirzai Tagay Devonbegi, the vizier of Astrakhanid ruler Imam Quli Khan, ordered the construction of a mosque and madrasa next to the grave site of the ascetic. Two mosques were built, one for the winter season and the other for the summer season, both in a single building. The whole complex was completed between 1635 and 1636. The Samarkand Codex of the Quran of Uthman was historically kept at the madrassa, having either been brought from Istanbul by the murids of Khoja Ahrar, or by Amir Timur as a war trophy from his conquests in Western Asia. After the Russian Empire conquered Samarkand in the 1868, the Russian army under Major General Alexander Konstantinovich Abramov forcibly removed the Quran from the madrassa, despite the local ulama's attempt to prevent this by evacuating the manuscript to Bukhara, and sent it to the Imperial Library in Saint Petersburg (now the Russian National Library).

During the Soviet period, the mosque and madrasa were abandoned, resulting in the building undergoing a state of dilapidation. After World War II, restoration works were gradually carried out to the buildings in the complex. At the beginning of the 21st century, the complex was completely restored and is now a major tourist attraction in Samarkand.

== Architecture ==
The Khoja Ahrar Complex is primarily made up of a mosque, madrasa and the tomb of Khwaja Akhrar, a style typical for Sufi religious complexes. As with the similar Memorial Complex of Imam al-Bukhari, the facade of the buildings in the Khoja Ahrar Complex all point in the direction of Mecca. The floor of the complex, including its courtyard, are made of bricks.

The madrasa of the complex is built in a traditional Timurid architectural style. It features a square layout with an inner courtyard that can be entered via four iwans on each side, with the southwestern iwan facing Mecca leading into the main building. A turquoise tiled dome on a cylindrical base tops the main ancillary hall of the madrasa. Much like the other madrasa also created by Nodir Devonbegi, the it is a carbon copy of the Sher-Dor Madrasah, with the exception of the dome layouts.

The mosque is a smaller structure located next to the madrasa. It is rectangular in layout, with the main prayer halls for summer and winter being almost completely exposed to the outside, only separated by the wooden fence. Two wooden pillars act as support structures of each prayer hall. The tiled mihrab is etched deep into the centre of the qibla wall for both prayer halls, while circular mosiac patterns can be seen on the centre of the underside of the roof of both. The overall design of the mosque is essentially a simplified version of the Bolo Haouz Mosque, a historic mosque in the city of Bukhara. A small cylindrical minaret, purely a decorative feature, stands in the main courtyard of the mosque.

In a courtyard outside the mosque lie the tombs of Khwaja Ahrar as well as those of his family and followers of the Naqshbandi order. Elaborately carved tombstones and sanduga adorn the graves, some of which are raised. In accordance to a minority opinion in the Hanafi school of thought (which was the dominant school of thought in Uzbekistan), the tombs are not located behind the qibla, to prevent worshippers from praying directly to the graves.

== See also ==
- Khwaja Ahrar
- Samarkand Kufic Quran
- List of mosques in Uzbekistan
