= List of mosques in Uzbekistan =

This is a list of mosques in Uzbekistan.

Name	Images	Location	Year/century	Remarks
Ak Mosque		Khiva	1838-1842	Part of UNESCO World Heritage Site Itchan Kala.
Baland Mosque		Bukhara	16th-century	Part of UNESCO World Heritage Site Historic Centre of Bukhara.
Bibi-Khanym Mosque		Samarkand	1404	Part of UNESCO World Heritage Site Samarkand – Crossroads of Culture.
Bolo Haouz Mosque		Bukhara	1712	Part of UNESCO World Heritage Site Historic Centre of Bukhara.
Chor Minor		Bukhara	1807	Part of UNESCO World Heritage Site Historic Centre of Bukhara.
Court Mosque		Bukhara	17th century	
Imam al-Bukhari Mosque		Samarkand	1998	
Khoja Ahror Valiy Mosque		Tashkent	1451	
Hazrat-Hyzr Mosque		Samarkand	19th century	Original construction was the oldest mosque in Samarkand, before being razed by the Mongols. Current building is the 19th-century reconstruction.
Hazrat Imam Mosque		Tashkent	2007	
Juma Mosque		Khiva	10th century	Part of UNESCO World Heritage Site Itchan Kala. Current building dates back to the 18th century.
Kalyan Mosque		Bukhara	12th century	Part of UNESCO World Heritage Site Historic Centre of Bukhara.
Khodja Nisbatdor Mosque		Samarkand	19th century	
Khoja Ahrar Mosque		Samarkand	1630-1635	
Khoja Gaukushan Ensemble		Bukhara	1598	
Khonakhan Mosque		Margilan	N/A	
Kunya-Ark Citadel Mosque		Khiva	19th—early-20th century	Part of UNESCO World Heritage Site Itchan Kala.
Magok-i-Attari Mosque		Bukhara	9th-10th century	Part of UNESCO World Heritage Site Historic Centre of Bukhara.
Magok-i-Kurpa Mosque		Bukhara	1637	Part of UNESCO World Heritage Site Historic Centre of Bukhara.
Minor Mosque		Tashkent	2014	
Khoja Ahrar Complex		Samarkand	1636	Original construction dates back to the 15th century in another location. Current building was built in 1636.
Namazgoh Mosque		Tashkent	Mid-19th century	
Ohun Guzar Mosque		Tashkent	N/A	
Rukhobod Mosque		Samarkand	N/A	
Tilla Sheixa Mosque		Tashkent	N/A	
Langarota Mosque		Qashqadaryo	1448	
Pansod Mosque		Andijan	N/A	

== See also ==
- Islam in Uzbekistan
- Lists of mosques
