= Abdumalik Mosque =

Mosque in Namangan, Uzbekistan

- Abdumalik masjidi

Religion
- Affiliation: Islam

Location
- Location: Namangan, Uzbekistan

Architecture
- Type: mosque
- Completed: 1913
- Materials: brick, wood, concrete

Abdumalik mosque is a cultural heritage site in Uzbekistan. Architectural monument. In 1913, the General Governorate of Turkestan in Namangan district of Fergana region established it. Currently, it is located in the "Yangi hayot" neighborhood of Gova village, Chust District, Namangan region.

== Background ==
By the decision of the Cabinet of Ministers of the Republic of Uzbekistan in 2014, the architectural monument was included in the list of objects that cannot be pledged and mortgaged due to its historical, artistic or other cultural value. Nevertheless, in 2018, the historical building was transferred from the balance sheet of the Cultural Heritage Inspection to the balance sheet of the authority with the baseless claim that it was "a building built by the hashar, now neglected, the owner of which has not been identified" by the decision of the Chust district governor Bahadir Okhunov. At the initiative of the district administration, the historical monument, which was taken over by the authorities, was sold to an entrepreneur who is a citizen of Uzbekistan for 61 million sums through auctions. According to the decision of the district governor dated April 30, 2019, the reconstruction of this object was illegally allowed. As a result, 61.1 square meters of the ceiling of the Abdumalik mosque was repaired and repainted by the new owner of the historical building, causing serious damage of 806.5 million sums.

On October 4, 2019, by the decision of the Cabinet of Ministers of the Republic of Uzbekistan, the Abdumalik mosque was included in the national list of immovable property objects of tangible cultural heritage - it was taken under state protection as an architectural monument. According to the latest decision, now the object of cultural heritage is officially considered state property and is on the balance sheet of the cultural heritage department of Namangan Region based on the right of operational management.

According to reports in 2022, a criminal case was initiated against the officials of the Chust district administration and others due to the illegal activities known during the inspections of the cultural heritage protection inspection of the Cabinet of Ministers of the Republic of Uzbekistan, the Cultural Heritage Agency of the Ministry of Tourism and Cultural Heritage of the Republic of Uzbekistan, and the General Prosecutor's Office of the Republic of Uzbekistan; an investigation is currently underway.

== See also ==
- Bibi-Khanym Mosque
- Kalan Mosque
- Bolo Haouz Mosque
