= Shrine of Hasan ar-Ra'ai =

Islamic shrine located in Palestine

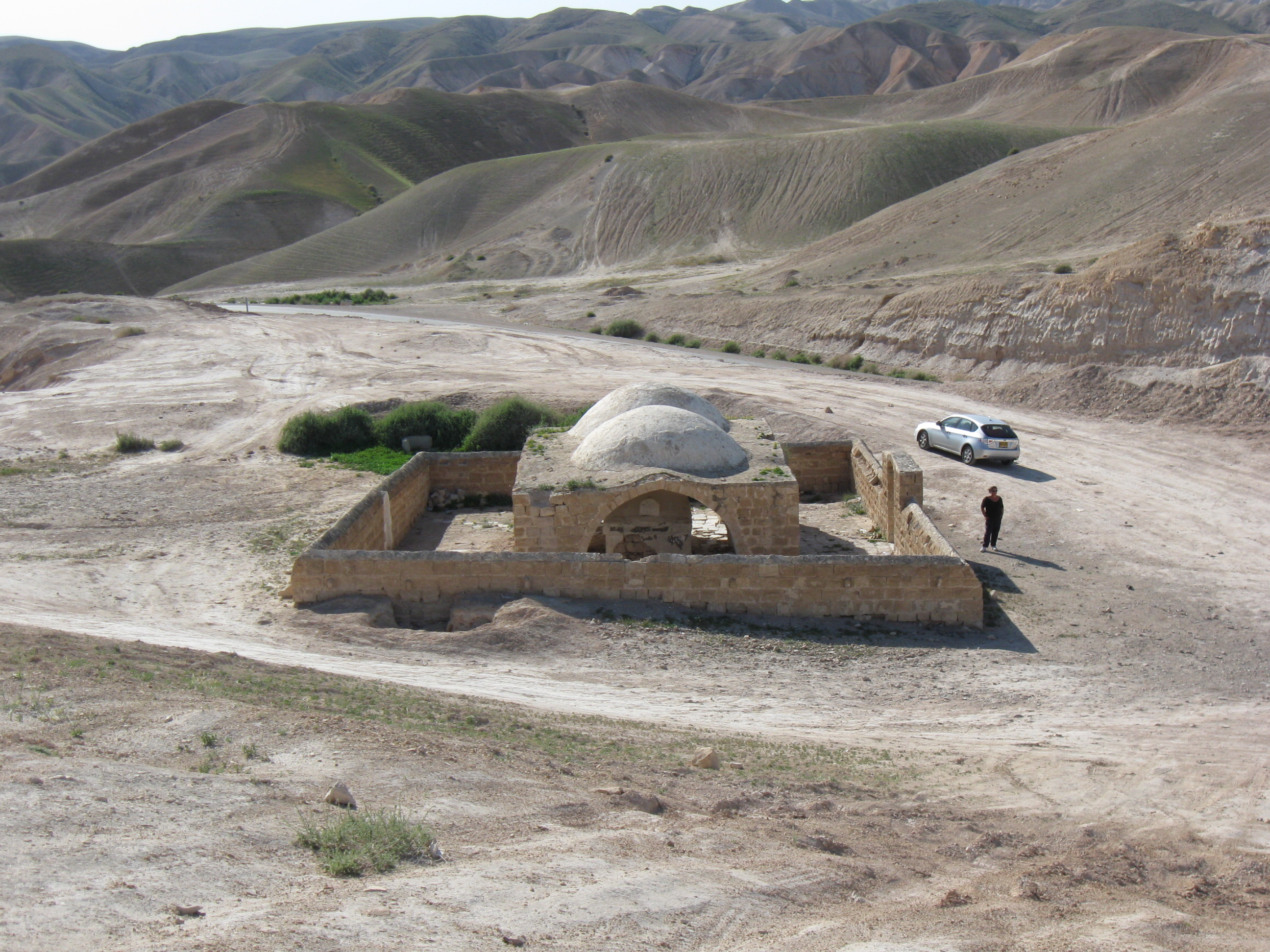
- Aerial view of the shrine in 2010
- Interactive map of Shrine of Hasan ar-Ra'ai
- Type: Shrine, mausoleum
- Location: Nabi Musa, Palestine
- Coordinates: 31°47′01″N 35°25′41″E
- Built: 19th century
- Architectural style: Ottoman architecture

The Shrine of Hasan ar-Ra'ai (Arabic: مقام حسن الرعيعي, Hebrew: מקאם א-רעי) is a shrine located in Nabi Musa, Palestine. Built during the Ottoman period in the 19th century, the shrine is a domed sanctuary centred around the grave of a shepherd named Hasan, who is believed by locals to be a confidant of the biblical prophet Moses. Before World War II, the shrine was a major checkpoint in the Nabi Musa pilgrimage festival, with pilgrims stopping to gather at the shrine before making their way to the nearby tomb and mosque complex of Nabi Musa. After 1948, the pilgrimage gradually decreased in size and was ultimately abandoned in the 21st century.

== Architecture ==
The date of the construction of the shrine is unknown, although the present day shrine exhibits Ottoman architecture and has inscriptions bearing the date 1270 in the Islamic calendar, which corresponds to 1853–1854 in the Gregorian calendar. However, the shrine had seemingly existed earlier than that, as it was visited by traveller Andrey Muravyov in 1830, along with another shrine dedicated to an unspecified Lady Aisha. The Municipality of Jericho provides an Ottoman origin for the shrine, stating that the shrine is a tomb of the 19th-century caretaker of the nearby Nabi Musa religious complex who was named Hasan, and not of a companion of the biblical prophet.

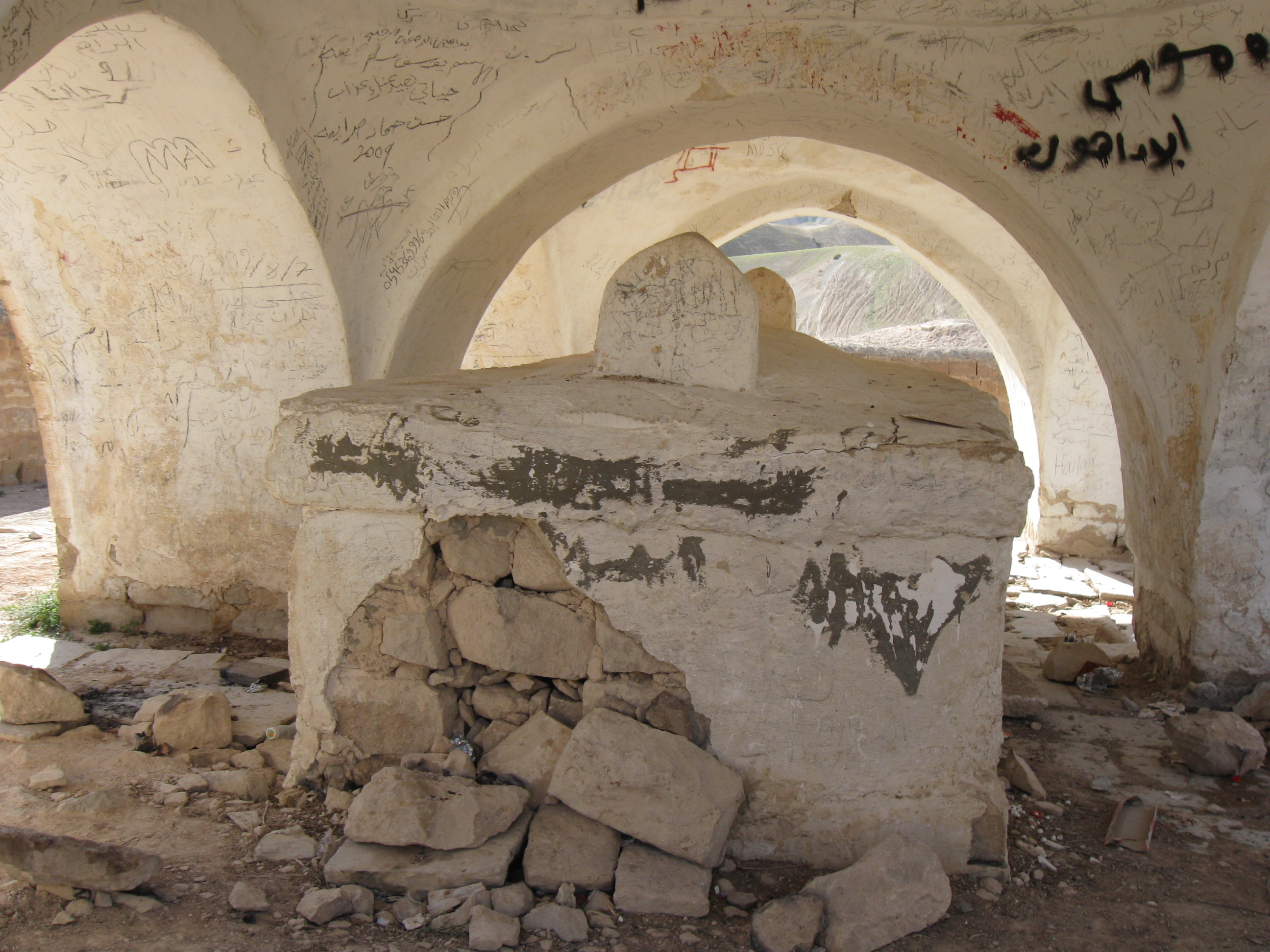
The tomb of Hasan ar-Ra'ai, inside one of the rooms.

Made out of sandstone bricks, the shrine has a rectangular layout plan, divided into two square rooms, with each room topped by a flat dome, while six arched entrances (two on the length, one on the breadth) lead into the shrine. The tomb of Hasan ar-Ra'ai is marked by a simple stone sanduga in the first of the two rooms. Sandstone brick walls surround the shrine and keep it fenced. A mihrab to indicate the direction of the qibla is embedded in the southern fence wall of the shrine, with another two additional unused mihrabs situated in the eastern and western fence walls that are intended to point in the direction of Jerusalem, which was the former qibla before it was changed to Mecca.

== See also ==
- Nabi Musa
- Maqam (shrine)
