= 'Abd al-Nabi Islamic Cemetery =

Abandoned Muslim cemetery in Tel Aviv

'Abd an-Nabi Islamic Cemetery
- مقبرة عبد النبي الإسلامية (Arabic); בית קברות מוסלמי עבד אל נבי (Hebrew)
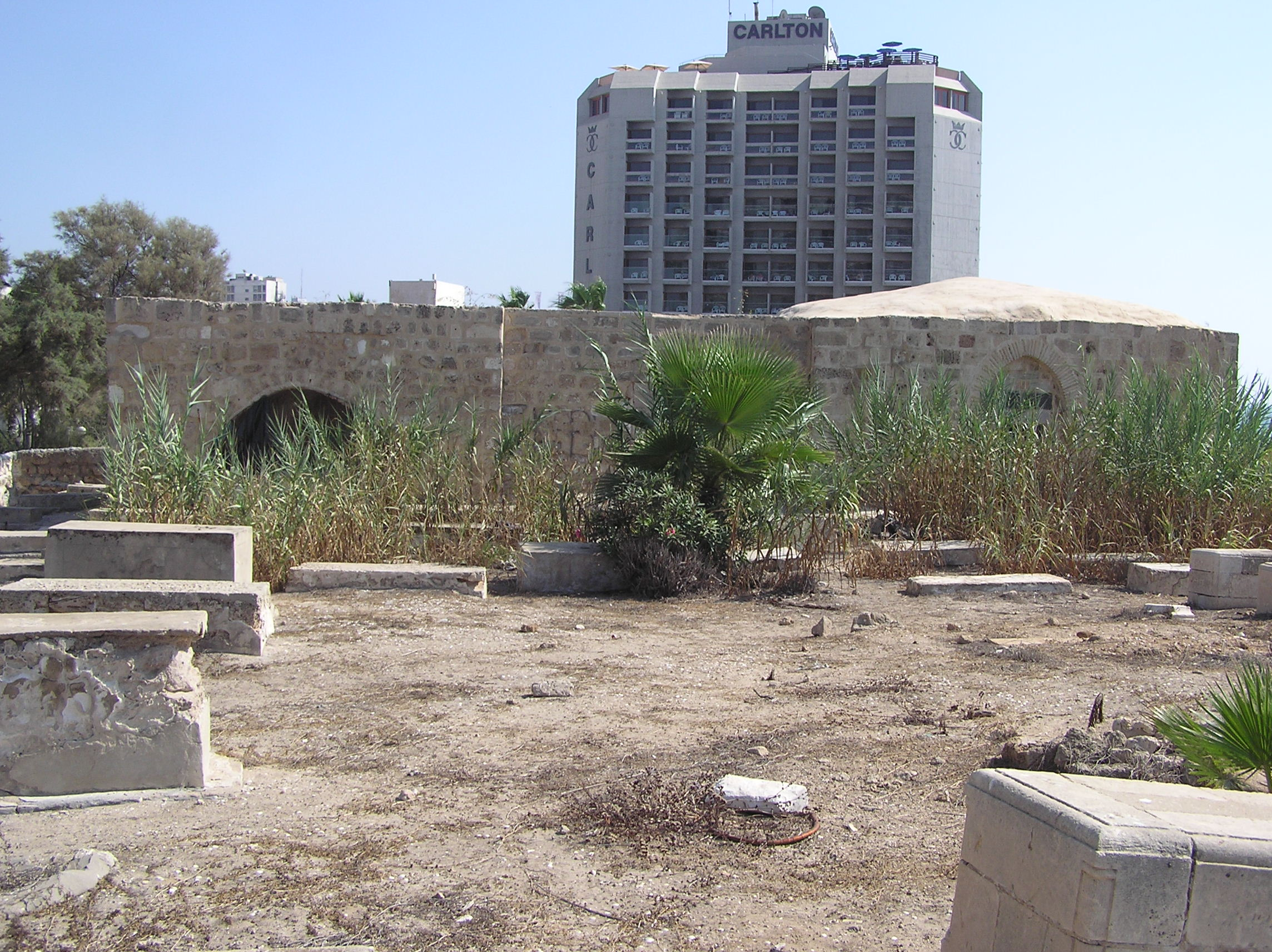
- The shrine of 'Abd an-Nabi in the cemetery in 2012.
- Interactive map of 'Abd an-Nabi Islamic Cemetery
- 32°05′15″N 34°46′11″E
- Type: Cemetery
- Location: Tel Aviv

History
- Built: 16th century (shrine) c. 1850 (cemetery)

Site notes
- Architectural style: Ottoman architecture

The ‘Abd an-Nabi Islamic Cemetery (Hebrew: בית קברות מוסלמי עבד אל נבי, Arabic: مقبرة عبد النبي الإسلامية) is an abandoned Muslim cemetery located within the Independence Park in Tel Aviv. Established in the 19th century, much of the cemetery has been cleared for the construction of the Hilton Tel Aviv in 1963, while only around a hundred tombstones as well as a 16th-century shrine remain in the cemetery.

== Etymology ==
The name 'Abd an-Nabi, alternatively spelled Abdul Nabi or Abdel Nebi, is an Arabic male name which means "servant of the Prophet."

== History ==
The earliest burial in the cemetery is that of 'Abd an-Nabi, a Muslim holy man who is entombed in the shrine as well as the namesake of the cemetery. Researcher of Islamic archaeology, Andrew Petersen, suggested that the shrine dates back to the 16th century due to it having Ottoman elements, such as the arches. Throughout the second half of the 19th century, a Muslim cemetery developed around the shrine of 'Abd al-Nabi, serving the needs of residents in Al-Mas'udiyya and Jaffa. The cemetery became officially recognized by the government in 1902 following a cholera epidemic in Jaffa, although it was later abandoned in the late 1940s, during the early stages of the Arab–Israeli conflict. Due to its abandonement and close location to the shore, between 1960 and the late 1970s, the Israeli youth would lounge and sunbath on the rectangular sanduga that stood atop some of the graves.

In 1962, the presence of the graves in the cemetery delayed construction works on the Hilton Tel Aviv until a local qāḍī gave a fatwa permitting exhumations to be carried out if necessary. This decision was met with protests from Palestinians and Arab inhabitants of Jaffa. Most of the cemetery was subsequently exhumed in 1963, leaving behind only a few hundred graves as well as the 16th-century shrine of 'Abd al-Nabi.

== Architecture ==
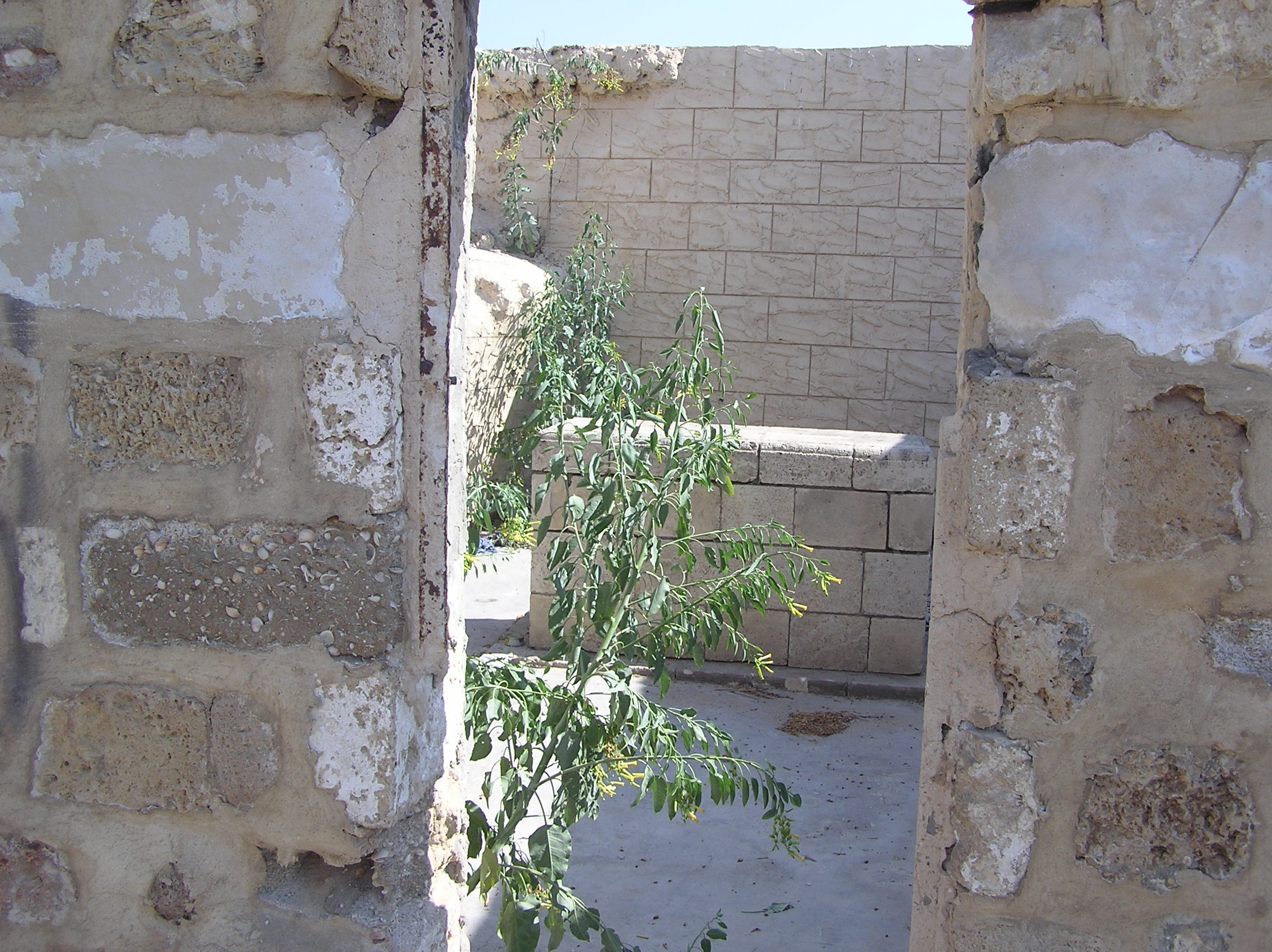
The sanduga over the grave of 'Abd an-Nabi in the courtyard of the shrine

The shrine of 'Abd an-Nabi is built in an Ottoman architectural style, with materials used being predominately brick and stone. The shrine has a rectangular layout and is divided into three rooms, one of them a courtyard. It is entered through a doorway in the northwestern wall that is decorated with ablaq masonry.

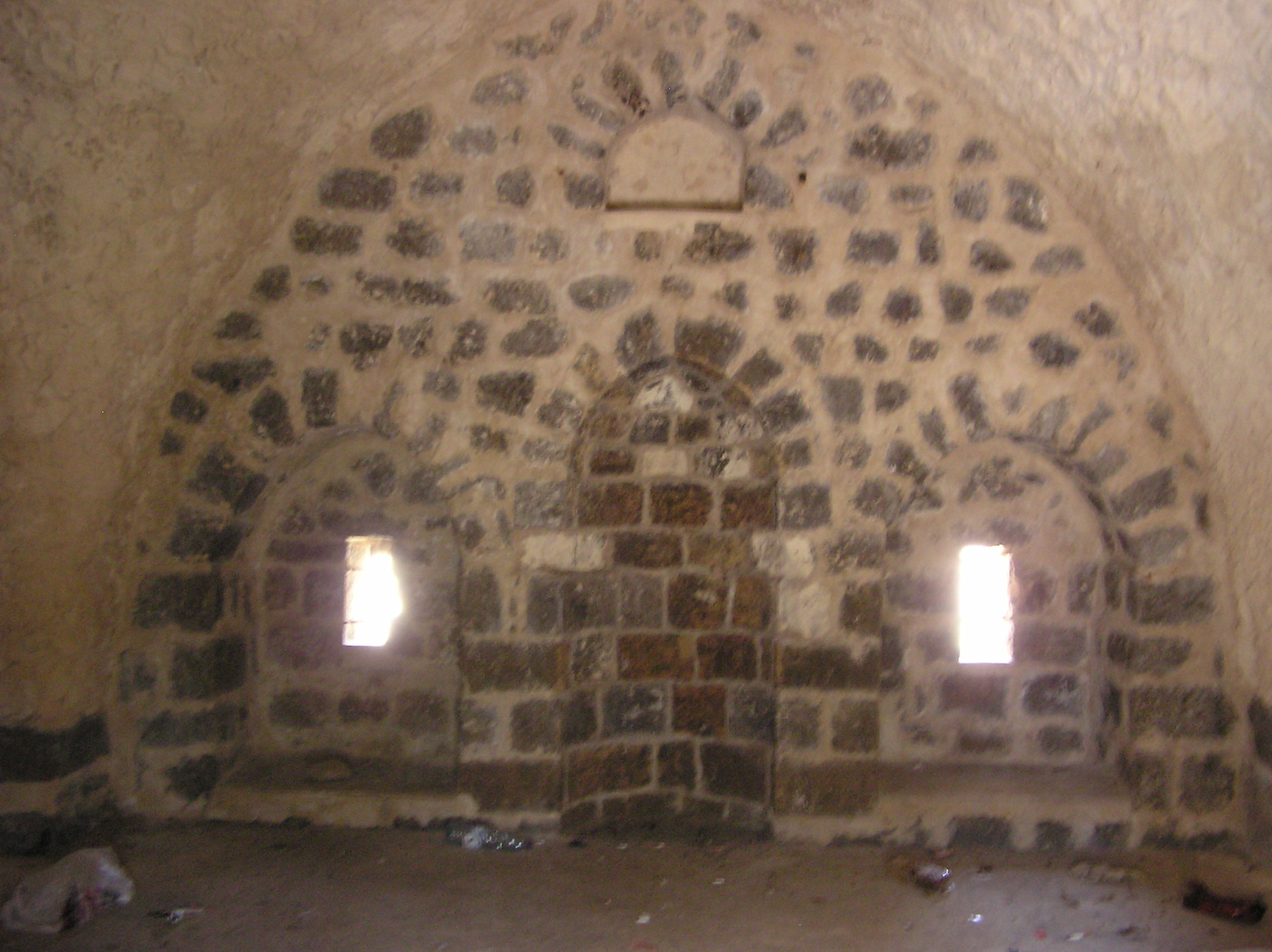
The musalla in the shrine.

The first accessible room is a musalla to provide a place of prayer for visitors at the cemetery. A mihrab to indicate the direction of prayer is etched into the southwestern wall of the room. A doorway opposite the mihrab leads into the courtyard, where the tomb of 'Abd al-Nabi is situated. It is a simple sanduga placed atop the grave. The third room on the shrine has arches on each corner and has an unknown purpose.

== See also ==
- Maqam (shrine)
