= Magok-i-Attari Mosque =

Mosque in Bukhara, Uzbekistan

Maghoki Attori Mosque
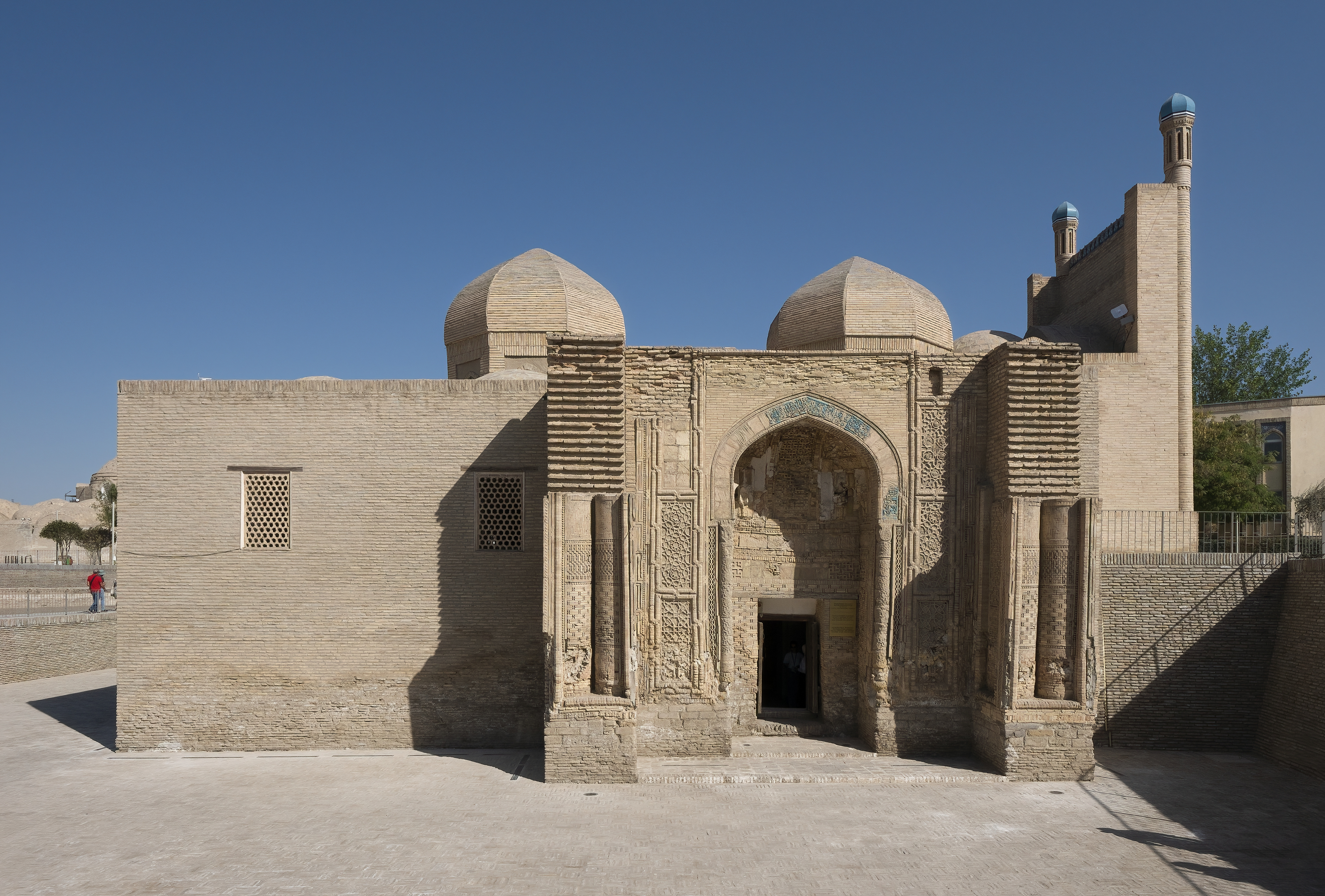
- South side of the Mosque

- Location within Uzbekistan

Religion
- Affiliation: Islam
- Status: Mosque (formerly); Carpet Museum

Location
- Location: Bukhara, Uzbekistan
- Coordinates: 39.7732°N 64.4183°E

Architecture
- Type: Mosque
- Style: Islamic architecture Persian architecture
- Completed: 9th-10th century

Maghoki Attori Mosque (Uzbek: Magʻoki Attori masjidi, Tajik: Масҷиди Мағокии Атторӣ, romanized: Masjidi Maghokii Attori, Persian: مسجد مغاکی عطاری, romanized: Masjed-e Maghākī-ye Attārī) is a historical mosque in Bukhara, Uzbekistan. It forms a part of the historical religious complex of Lyab-i Hauz. The mosque is located in the historical center of Bukhara, about 300 meters southwest of Po-i-Kalyan, 100 meters southwest of the Toqi Telpak Furushon trading dome and 100 meters east of Lab-i Hauz. It is a part of UNESCO World Heritage Site Historic Centre of Bukhara. Today, the mosque is used as a carpet museum.

== History ==
It is speculated as built in the 9th to 10th century on the remains of a Zoroastrian temple from the pre-Islamic era. Before the Arab conquest there was a bazaar on the site of Maghoki Attori Mosque. It was a market for idols, potions and spices – attor (perfumes) and other goods. Besides this, there was formerly a Temple of the Moon (Mah) close to this place. Before the construction of the first synagogue, Jews in Bukhara had shared a place in the mosque with Muslims. Some say that Bukharian Jews and Muslims worshipped alongside each other in the same place at the same time. Other sources insist that Jews worshipped after Muslims. The mosque is also notable for being one of the oldest surviving mosques in Central Asia and one of the few surviving buildings in Bukhara from the time before the Mongol invasion. In the 12th century, when Kara-Khanids reigned in Bukhara, the mosque was substantially rebuilt and re-dressed. It also received a new main facade in the south. In the middle of the 15th century, it was restored and a new portal with iwan was built in the eastern ground. At the beginning of the 1930s the mosque was restored again.

The first mosques were laid in Transoxiana by the Arabs in the process of conquest of some of its regions, moreover, only in the main cities, with the purpose of converting the population to the new faith, they were often laid on the site of pre-Islamic religious buildings. Thus, in Bukhara, the Magoki-Attari mosque arose on the site of a former fire temple. Its history goes back to the distant Sogdian country, when this area was the site of the Makh (Moon) bazaar, there was a temple and images of folk deities were sold.

Archaeological researches have shown that at the end of IX-XI centuries there were two monumental buildings on this place. The lower mosque had external brick walls, brick floor, flat ceiling on powerful wooden beams supported by carved wooden columns. Archaeologically it was established that on this very place there was a fire-worshippers' temple, which was later adapted to the mosque; outside the mosque was decorated with figurative masonry of sawn burnt bricks. It burned down in the big fire of 937 and lay in ruins for a long time. The radically rebuilt burnt brick mosque with a flat slab hall on round columns was smaller in size. Its interior was decorated with paintings, clay carvings and carved painted ganch. Over time, the mosque became dilapidated and in the second half of the XII century a new building was built in its place, which has survived to this day.

Gradually the building was covered with a cultural layer and destroyed. In the XV century the arch of the southern portal collapsed. By the first half of the XVI century the mosque so "sunk" into the ground that during the period of great reconstruction of this part of the city by the ruler Abdulaziz-khan (1540-1550) it even wanted to demolish it. But this was prevented by Ahmad Kasani (d. 1542), the leader of the Sufi brotherhood Naqshbandiya, who liked to pray and meditate in the Magoki Attari Mosque. As a result, the mosque was rebuilt according to the old plan, but with new floor structures. The round columns in the interior were replaced by square ones, the double domes of the ceiling rested on them, the niche of the mihrab was lined with marble. In the upper part of the eastern wall the entrance was broken through and a small vestibule connected by a staircase to the hall of the mosque was added. In the niche of the portal in front of the vestibule above the entrance to the mosque placed a mosaic construction inscription with the date of reconstruction, from which a small fragment has survived to our time.

== Architecture ==
The building has a rectangular ground plan of 12 x 7.5 square meters. In the main axis of the building, the flat roof carries two octagonal tholobates with latticed arched windows. They also have octagonal domes. The floor of the mosque is about 4.50 meters below the Earth's surface. This is the reason for the mosque being called 'maghākī' which is Persian for "in a ditch" or "in a pit". Another "pit" mosque is the Magok-i-Kurpa Mosque located about 150 meters northwest. Narshakhi, in his History of Bukhara (ca. 950), named the mosque built on the site of the former temple "maghāk", i.e. "pit", because even then half of it was concealed from view by the rising soil level. The southern façade is most richly equipped and was the former main entrance. Ornaments are made mainly by the arrangement of cut and carved bricks and by terracotta tiles with floral motifs. The pointed arch of the iwan is resting on two quarter columns set in walls, decorated with wattle. On each side of the iwan, three rectangular frames with decorative patterns are arranged one above the other.

== Gallery ==
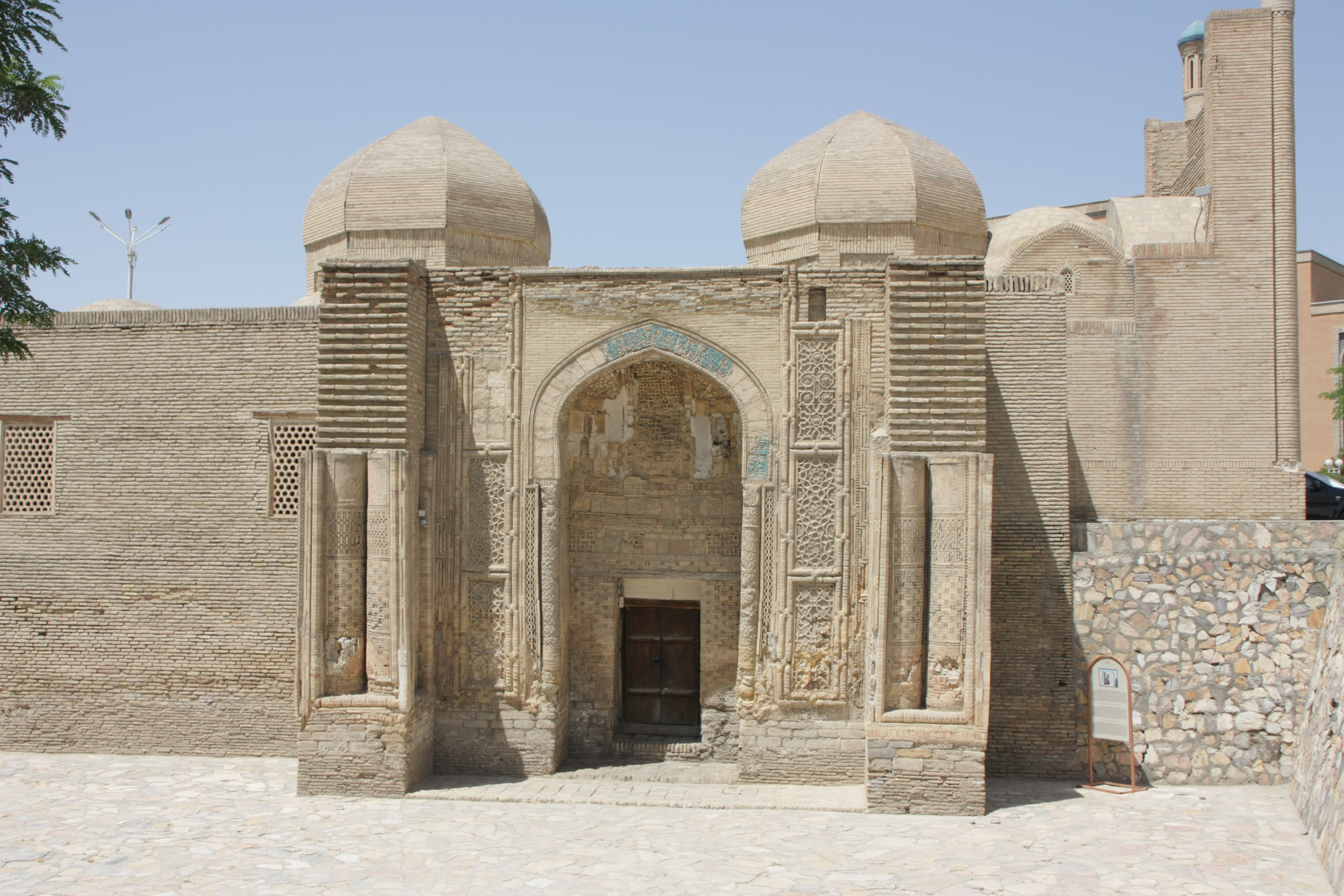
South entrance, 12th century.

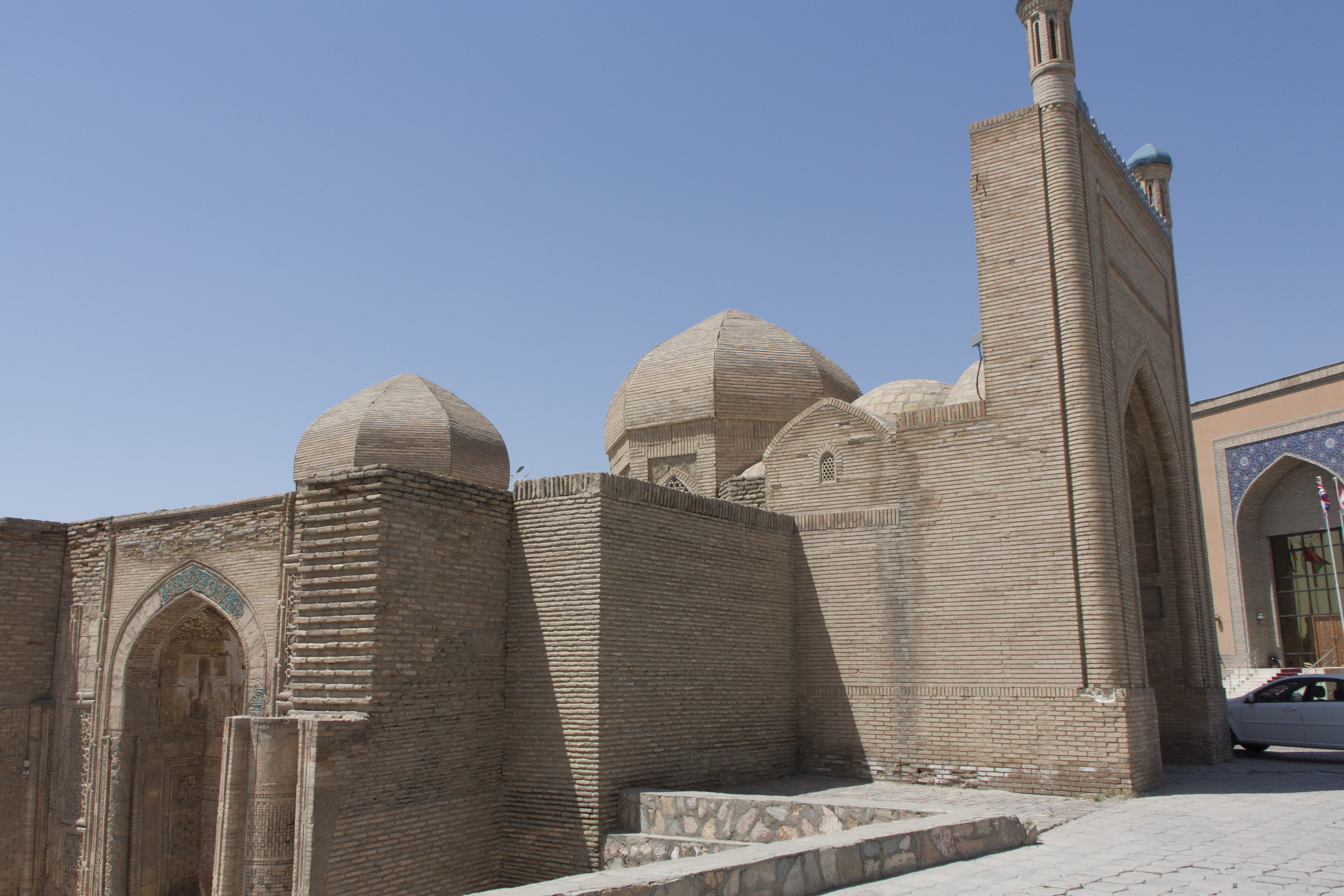
View of the mosque from the southeast.

== See also ==
- List of mosques in Uzbekistan
