= Magok-i-Kurpa Mosque =

Mosque in Bukhara, Uzbekistan

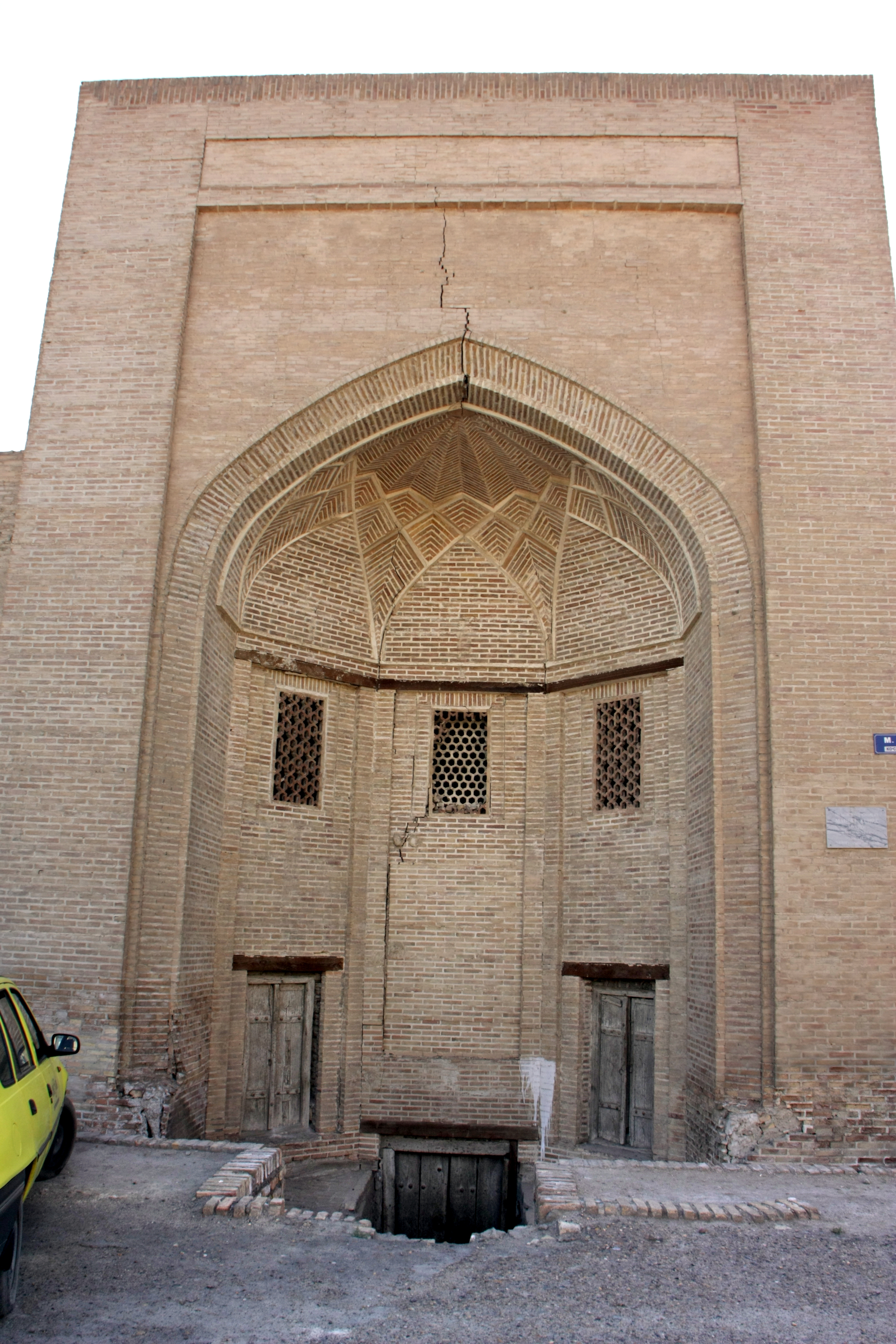
- The entrance iwan of Magok-i-Kurpa Mosque.

- Location within Uzbekistan

Religion
- Affiliation: Islam

Location
- Location: Bukhara, Uzbekistan
- Interactive map of Magok-i-Kurpa Mosque
- Coordinates: 39.7737°N 64.4167°E

Architecture
- Type: mosque
- Style: Islamic architecture Persian architecture
- Completed: 1637
- Dome: 12

The Magok-i-Kurpa Mosque is a historical mosque in the Uzbek city of Bukhara. It was built in 1637. The mosque is located in the historical center of Bukhara, about 250 meters southwest of Po-i-Kalyan and 10 meters west of Toqi Telpak Furushon trading dome. It is a part of UNESCO World Heritage Site Historic Centre of Bukhara.

== Architecture ==
The Magok-i-Kurpa mosque has a rectangular ground plan of 15 × 24 square meters. It has two storeys, with the lower storey, down a staircase, almost entirely below the surface of the earth. Therefore, the mosque also has its name addition "Magok-i" which means "in the hole" or "in the subsoil". Another "subsoil" mosque is the Magok-i-Attari Mosque located about 150 meters southeast.

The roof carries twelve domes. The main dome sits on a cylindrical drum and rises 20m above the ground.

== See also ==
- List of mosques in Uzbekistan
