= Maqam Sheikh al-Qatrawani =

Tomb-shrine in Atara, West Bank

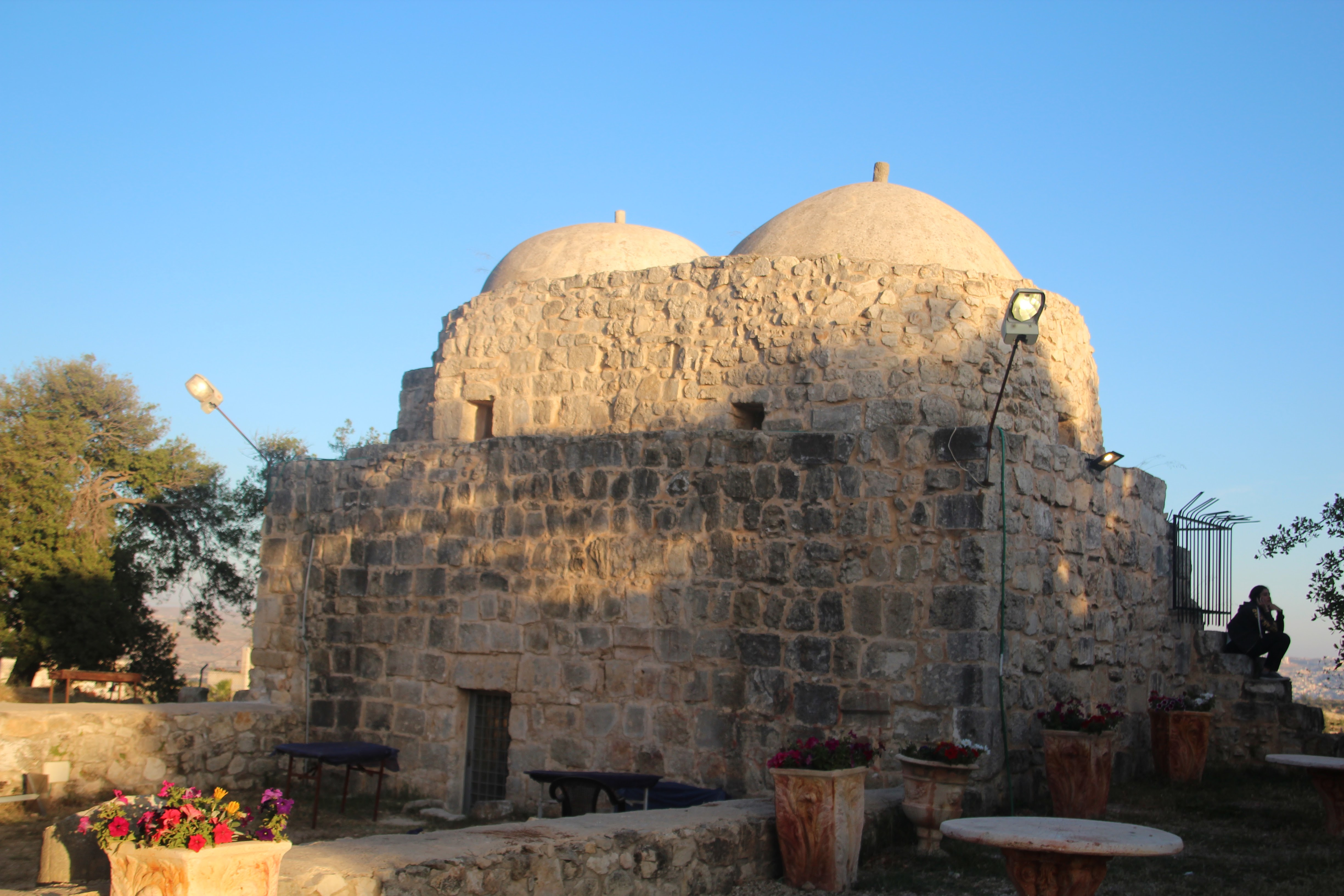
- The shrine in 2017

- Location within the West Bank

Religion
- Affiliation: Islam, Christianity

Location
- Location: Atara, Mandatory Palestine
- Coordinates: 31°59′36″N 35°11′52″E

Architecture
- Type: Shrine
- Style: Islamic architecture
- Completed: 16th century
- Dome: 2

The Maqam Sheikh al-Qatrawani (Arabic: مقام الشيخ القطرواني) is an Islamic shrine, located on the Dahrat Hamoud hill about 1.5 km south-west of Atara in the State of Palestine. The maqam was first established during the Mamluk rule over Palestine as one of a series of 16th-century watchtowers overlooking the nearby coast. It stands at 820 metres above sea level.

== History ==
The shrine was established in the 16th century during the Mamluk period on top of the ruins of a Byzantine monastery. The shrine was renovated in 1999. Sherds from the Byzantine, Crusader/Ayyubid and Mamluk eras have been found here.

== Architecture ==
The sanctuary is a rectangular building which is 9.8 meters in width, and 5.9 meters in length. It has two semi-spherical domes, measuring 3.8 and 3.9 meters in diameter respectively. The eastern dome is built of finely cut stones, while the western dome is built of small rough field-stones, but both kinds are of local origin. The northern wall is 85 centimeters thick and is constructed of small stones, mortar and rubble. The eastern room of the sanctuary contains a mihrab with the typical orientation to Mecca, as required in Islamic doctrine.

The cistern, currently blocked, is in front of the shrine and most likely collected rainwater in the past for the sanctuary. It possibly also drew water from the nearby spring of Wadi as-Saqi, located two kilometers south of the site. To the west of the shrine is a winepress cut through stone. Its basin is 1.8 metres deep and is coated with a layer of white plaster. A stone-cut cave is located in front of the shrine, but was blocked in 1984 by the residents of 'Atara for safety reasons. The tomb of Sheikh Ahmad al-Qatrawani, the building's namesake, is located west of the shrine's courtyard and has been plundered several times.

== Local legends ==
According to local legend, Sheikh Ahmad al-Qatrawani was a holy man from the town of Qatra, but left his hometown after he could not continue his religious duties there. A group of villages saw him laying at Bir Zeit. When asked of his origins, the Sheikh said that he was from Qatra and that angels brought him to the site where he would die. The residents of Atara, as well as nearby Ajjul and Silwad provided him with food and protection for four years and when they found him dead, they buried him just west of the sanctuary. Another popular tale claims that when al-Qatrawani died, his dead body descended onto the hilltop where his sanctuary stands.

== Christian tradition ==
Many Palestinian Christians argue, however, that the site was dedicated to Saint Catherine, suggesting the etymological origin of "Qatrawani" to be from "Catherine". Hamdan Taha also points out similarities between the Muslim tradition of al-Qatrawani descending to his burial place at the time of his death to the Christian tradition of Saint Catherine descending to Mount Sinai at the time of her death.

== See also ==
- Maqam (shrine)
