= Maqam (shrine) =

Islamic religious shrine

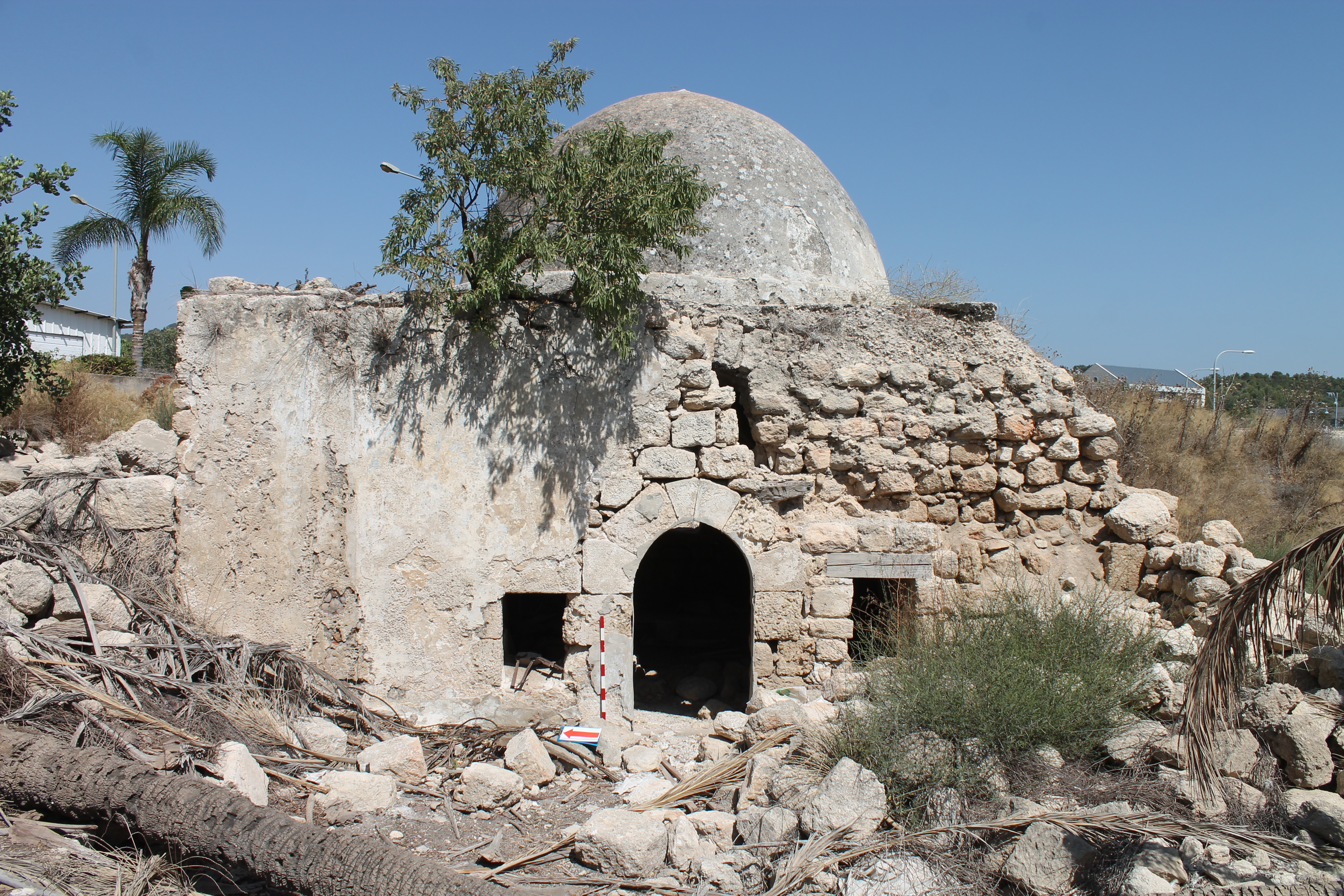
Maqam al-Khidr in al-Bassa

A maqām (Arabic: مقام) is a Muslim shrine constructed at a site linked to a religious figure or saint, commonly found in the Levant (or al-Shām), which comprises the present-day countries of Lebanon, Syria, Palestine, and Israel. It is usually a funeral construction, commonly cubic-shaped and topped with a dome.

The cult for holy sites in Islamic Syria heightened during the 12th and 13th centuries, particularly under Zangid and Ayyubid rule. Historians attribute this surge to the political climate, notably the Crusades and the Muslim reconquest of the region. Funded by rulers and the elite, these shrines functioned as points of piety, attracting individuals from different levels of society, generating employment opportunities, and contributing to economic growth. During this period, as demand increased, more sanctuaries emerged, some repurposed from Jewish and Christian holy sites, others built upon newly discovered tombs and relics, and some dedicated to honoring the graves of recent ulama and revered holy men.

Maqams continued to be revered sites in modern times as well. In the 19th century, Claude Reignier Conder described maqams as an essential part of folk religion in Palestine, with locals attaching immense importance to them. Researchers have observed that alongside celebrated Muslim figures, some maqams can also be associated with ancient Semitic pagan, Judaic, Samaritan, and Christian traditions.

The maqams of Palestine were considered highly significant to the field of biblical archaeology, as their names were used in the 18th and 19th centuries to identify much of biblical geography.

== Etymology ==
From Arabic literally "a place" or "station." It is used to denote a "sanctuary", such as a commemorative burial shrine or an actual tomb. Its meaning can be restricted only to built structures that can be entered at such sites. The literal meaning of maqam is "the place where one stands." Such name for a holy tomb is mostly used in Lebanon, Syria and Palestine.

The form mukam appears in the essays of European travelers of the 19th century; as well as the words waly, wely (Arabic: ويلي wālī "saint"), mazar, and mashhad.

In Maghreb, similar tombs are known as Marabout, in Turkic-speaking Muslim countries as türbe, dürbe, or aziz, and in Persian-speaking countries dargah.

== Purpose ==
Maqams were dedicated to Biblical and Quranic, real or mythical, male and female figures from ancient times to the time of the Arab conquest or even late Ottoman rule. Ali Qleibo, a Palestinian anthropologist, states that this built evidence constitutes "an architectural testimony to Christian/Moslem Palestinian religious sensibility and its roots in ancient Semitic religions." In 1877, the British explorer Claude Reignier Conder wrote that:

It is in worship at these shrines that the religion of the peasantry consists. Moslem by profession, they often spend their lives without entering a mosque, and attach more importance to the favour and protection of the village Mukam than to Allah himself, or to Mohammed his prophet.

Salah al-Houdalieh's study on Sheikh Shihab-Al-Din's maqam, which attracted rural Muslims from the village of Saffa, Ramallah, showed that visitations usually consisted of ritual prayers, burials, Quran recitation, commemorating the sheikh, or making vows. Every village in the Palestine region has a wali or patron saint, whom people, predominantly rural peasants, would call upon for help at his or her associated sanctuary. While wali can refer to both the saint and sanctuary, a sanctuary for a common saint is more precisely known as a maqam.

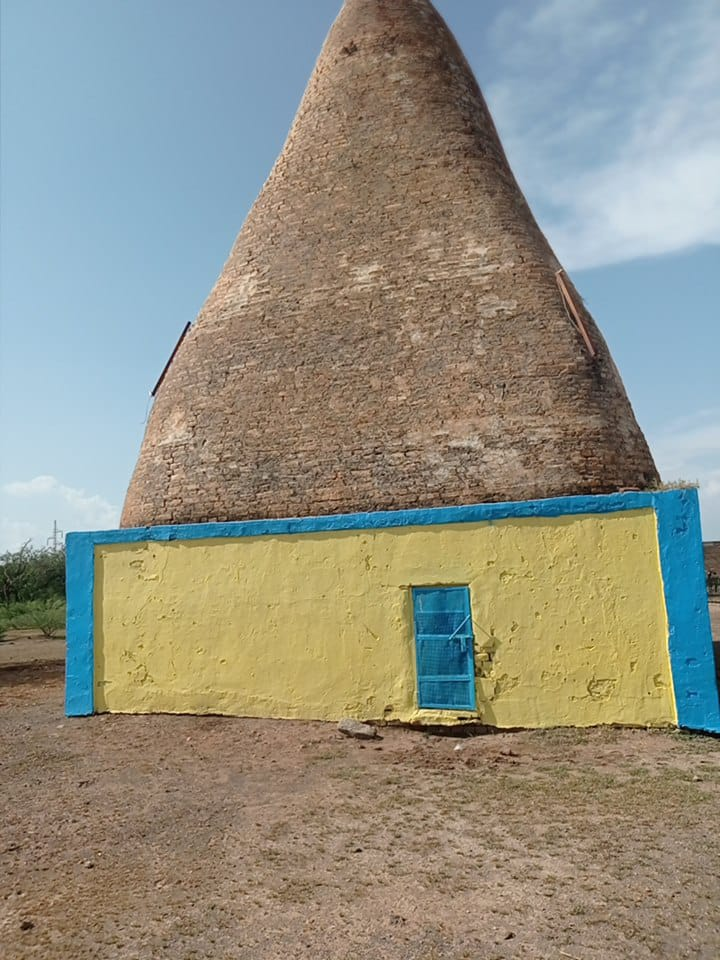
Maqam of Sheikh Al-Nuwairi in the village of Al-Qara, Egypt.

== Construction ==
The most popular type of maqam is a single chamber square building topped with a dome, in the middle of which there is a stone cenotaph, though the revered figures themselves were buried below ground level. In the south wall of the maqam, there is usually a small mihrab facing Mecca, decorated with inscriptions and floral ornament. The entrance to the chamber is mostly at the north wall. In the other arched walls there are usually small windows. Candelabras and lamps are hanging in an active maqam, a cenotaph is covered by a quilt (usually a green one), praying rugs are spread on the floor in front of the mihrab.

There are also bigger maqams, consisting of two, three or four chambers: prayer chamber, entrance hall, zawiya or a room for pilgrims to have a rest. Big maqams have two or three similar domes. In times of old, the dome was decorated by a metal spire with a crescent, but nowadays such decoration is rare.

The maqams do not always stand over the tombs of the saints to whom they are dedicated.

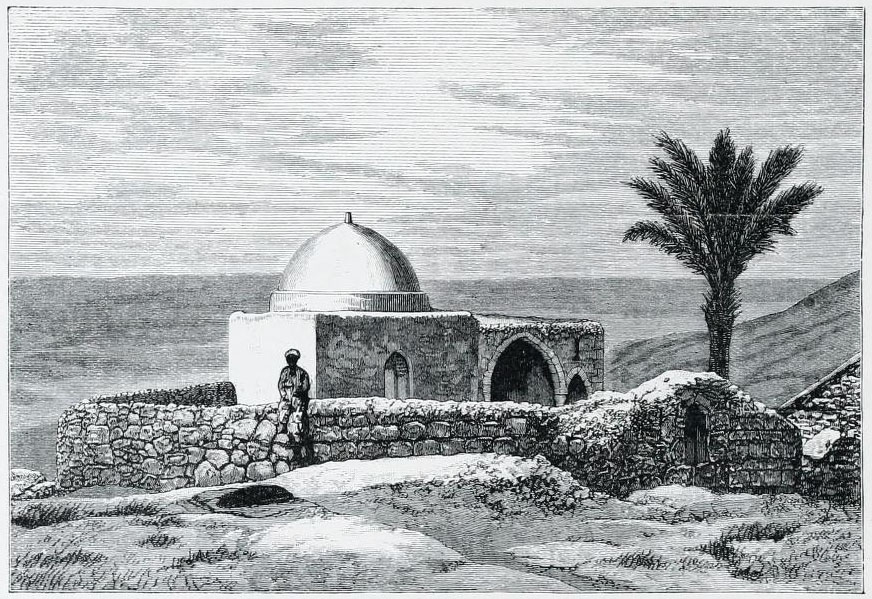
Maqam of Nabi Samit (Samson) in Sar'a, destroyed in the 1950s

They are often situated near an ancient carob or oak tree or a spring or rock cut water cistern. A Sacred tree was planted near maqams, mostly – a palm tree, oak or sycomore. There was also a well or spring. The location of maqams on or near these natural features is seen as indicative of ancient worship practices adapted by the local population and associated with religious figures.

As a rule, maqams were built on hilltops or at crossroads. Besides functioning as a shrine and prayer place, they served as guard points and landmarks for travelers and caravans. Over the years, new burial places appeared near maqams; it was considered an honour to be buried next to a saint.

== History ==
=== Early origins ===
According to Claude Reignier Conder, many maqams are originated in Jewish and Christian traditions from before the advent of Islam in the region. He identified seven types of maqams:

1. Biblical characters: "These are, no doubt, generally the oldest, and can often be traced back to Jewish tradition"
2. Christian sites venerated by the Muslim fellahin: "not always distinguishable from the first class, but often traceable to the teaching of the monasteries or to monkish sites"
3. Other native heroes or deities: "perhaps sometimes the most ancient sites of all"
4. Later and known historic characters
5. Saints named from the place where they occur, or having appellations connected with traditions concerning them
6. Sacred sites not connected with personal names: "Some of these are of the greatest value"
7. Ordinary Muslim names which may be of any date

=== Middle ages ===
In the seventh century, the Arab Rashiduns conquered the Levant; they were later succeeded by other Arabic-speaking Muslim dynasties, including the Umayyads, Abbasids and the Fatimids. Early Islam disapproved worshipping of holy men and their burial places, considering it a sort of idolatry. However, the Shiites built sumptuous tombs for their deceased leaders – imams and sheikhs, and turned those tombs into religious objects. Very soon Sunnis followed their example. Arab travellers and geographers ‘Ali al-Harawi, Yaqut al-Hamawi and others described in their essays many Christian and Muslim shrines in Syria, Palestine and Egypt.

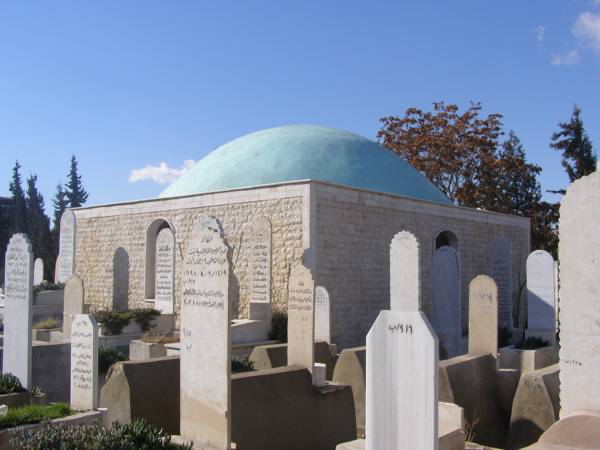
Maqam of Umayyad caliph Abd al-Malik ibn Marwan in Bab al-Saghir, Damascus

During the times of Mamluk dynasty, monumental tombs were built for Muslim holy men, scientists and theologists, some of these tombs have come down to present times. The major part of them is located in Egypt, and some parts are also in Syria and Palestine. These are namely the famous Rachel's Tomb in Bethlehem (though the burial place of matriarch Rachel was worshipped even before), the splendid mausoleum of Abu Hurairah in Yavne and the maqam of sheikh Abu ‘Atabi in Al-Manshiyya, Acre.

=== Ottoman period ===
In the Ottoman Empire times, maqams were constructed everywhere, and old sanctuaries were taken under restoration. New buildings were not as monumental and pompous as before, and looked quite unpretentious. In Turkish period, maqams had simple construction and almost no architectural décor.

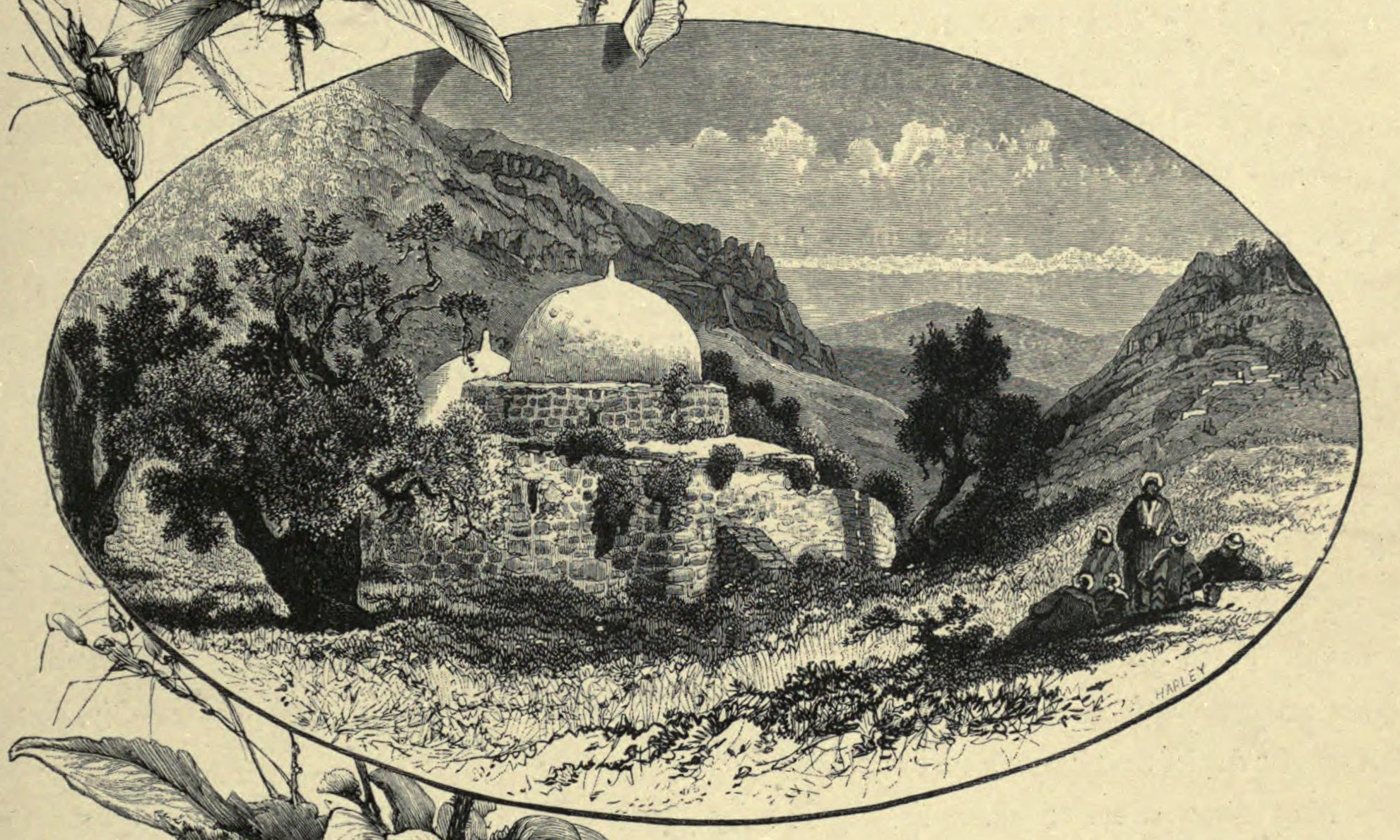
Maqam in Northern Palestine (C. Wilson, 1881).

Mosques were uncommon in Palestinian villages until the late 19th century, but practically every village had at least one maqam which served as sites of worship in the Palestinian folk Islam popular in the countryside over the centuries. Christians and Jews also held some of the maqams to be holy, such as that of Nabi Samwil. In the period of Ottoman rule over Palestine, most of these sites were visited collectively by members of all three faiths who often travelled together with provisions for a multi-day journey; by the Mandate Palestine period, politicization led to segregation. Some maqams, like Nabi Rubin and Nabi Musa among others, were also the focus of seasonal festivals (mawsims) that thousands would attend annually.

There is, however, in nearly every village, a small whitewashed building with a low dome – the "mukam," or "place," sacred to the eyes of the peasants. In almost every landscape such a landmark gleams from the top of some hill, just as, doubtless, something of the same kind did in the old Canaanite ages.

=== Modern era ===
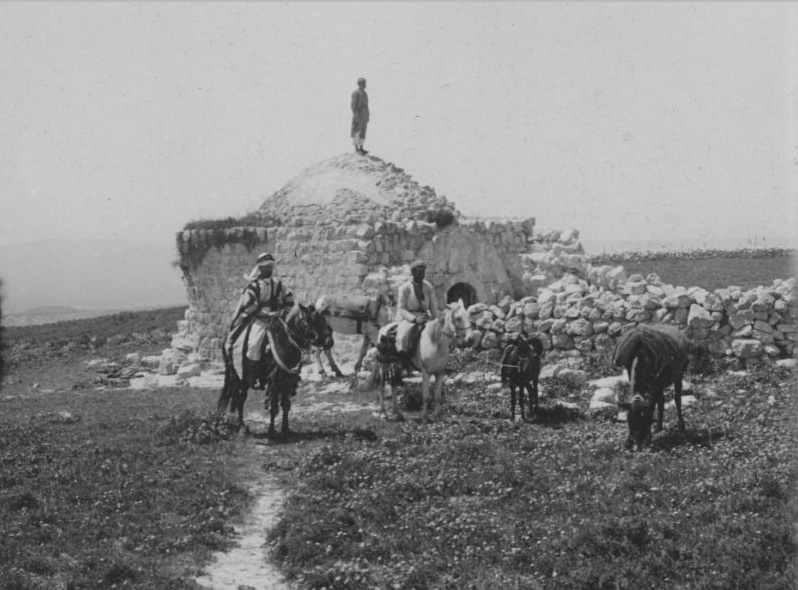
Maqam in Judea, 1940s

The period of Mandatory Palestine has become the last time of maqams' prosperity. Dilapidated Muslim shrines were restored, and also new ones were built. The British built over and donated to Bedouins the maqam of Sheikh Nuran, which was damaged during the Sinai and Palestine campaign. This maqam was in the battle epicentre during the 1948 Arab–Israeli War. After having captured it, Israeli soldiers turned it into a watch and firing point. Since that time, the maqam of Sheikh Nuran has been a memorial for the Israel Defense Forces.

After the State of Israel was formed, numerous shrines were turned into Jewish shrines. For example, the Mausoleum of Abu Hurayra is now mostly seen as the tomb of the Gamaliel II in Yavne; the Maqam with seven domes of Ali in Yazur was converted into a synagogue; the mazar of Sakina bint Husayn in Tiberias was reconsecrated as the tomb of Rachel, the spouse of Rabbi Akiva; the maqam of sheikh al-Gharbawi into the tomb of Mattathias; the muqam of Nabi Sheman near the Junction Eyal, was identified with the tomb of Simeon (son of Jacob).

In ancient times, all maqams with the domes were coloured in white. More recently, Palestinians and Arab citizens of Israel coloured the domes of shrines green, a color associated with Muhammad. The battle for one or another shrine resulted in the "war of colours", as it was called in the press. Religious Jews paint domes in blue or white and install Jewish symbols, and Muslims, when returning, remove the symbols and repaint the dome green.

== Notable maqams ==
No more than 300 maqams have survived out of 800 existing in Palestine in 1948, the remainder having been demolished. Half of them are in Israel-proper, the remainder in the West Bank and Gaza Strip; most of the West Bank has been under Israeli control since 1967, and Gaza between 1967 and 2005. According to another source, the number of Palestinian maqams left is 184, with only 70 remaining in Israel-proper.

Picture	Name	Former Location	Present Location	Coordinates	Built in	Current state	Country
	‘Abd an-Nabi	Al-Mas'udiyya	Tel Aviv	32°05′15″N 34°46′11″E		Object no longer in use	Israel
	Hasan ar-Ra‘i	Nabi Musa	Nabi Musa	31°46′51″N 35°25′29″E		Active shrine	Palestine
	Maqam al-Khidr	Al-Bassa	Shlomi, Israel	33°04′41″N 35°08′36″E		Destroyed	Israel
	Muadh ibn Jabal (Sheikh Mu‘alla)	Imwas	Canada Park	31°50′08″N 34°59′30″E		Reconstructed	Israel
	Nabi ‘Anir	Khirbat an-Nabi ‘Anir	Gush Talmonim	31°57′20″N 35°06′27″E		Object no longer in use	Palestine
	Nabi Bulus	Khirbat an-Nabi Bulus	Beit Shemesh	31°42′51″N 34°58′51″E		Destroyed	Israel
	Nabi Kifl	Al-Tira, Ramle	Tirat Yehuda	32°00′25″N 34°55′35″E		Object no longer in use	Israel
	Nabi Shitt	Bashshit	Aseret	31°49′28″N 34°44′55″E		Object no longer in use	Israel
	Caliph Abd al-Malik ibn Marwan	Bab al-Saghir Cemetery	Bab al-Saghir near Mu'awiya's mausoleum, Damascus	33°30′22″N 36°18′23″E	Founded in the time of the Umayyads		Syria
	Sheikh ‘Abdallah	Dura al-Qar'	Beit El, Located in area expropriated from Dura al-Qar' for Beit El	31°56′57″N 35°13′55″E			Palestine
	Sheikh ‘Abdallah as-Sahili	Balad al-Sheikh	Nesher	32°46′18″N 35°02′34″E		Object no longer in use	Israel
	Sheikh Abu ‘Atabi	Al-Manshiyya, Acre	Acre, Israel	32°56′15″N 35°05′32″E		Dwelling house	Israel
	Sheikh Abu Ghazala	Khirbat as-Sukriyya	No'am	31°34′04″N 34°46′48″E		Object no longer in use	Israel
	Sheikh Abu Shusha	Ghuwayr Abu Shusha	Migdal, Israel	32°51′13″N 35°30′27″E		Object no longer in use	Israel
	Sheikh Abu az-Zeitun	Beitunia	Beit Horon	31°53′15″N 35°08′04″E		Object no longer in use	Palestine
	Sheikh Ahmad al-Hubani	Allar, Jerusalem	Bar Giora	31°43′31″N 35°04′49″E		Object no longer in use	Israel
	Sheikh ‘Ali ad-Dawayimi	Al-Dawayima	Amatzia, Israel	31°32′10″N 34°53′13″E	Founded in the time of the Abbasids		Israel
	Sheikh ‘Amir	Jaba', Haifa Subdistrict	Mizpe Ofer	32°39′16″N 34°57′54″E		Reconstructed	Israel
	Sheikh ‘Awad	Hamama	Ashkelon	31°41′15″N 34°33′47″E	Founded in the time of the Ottoman Empire		Israel
	Sheikh Baraz ad-Din (Sheikh as-Sadiq)	Majdal Yaba	Migdal Afek	32°05′00″N 34°57′27″E		Reconstructed	Israel
	Sheikh Bilal	Azmut	Elon Moreh	32°14′33″N 35°19′40″E		Object no longer in use	Palestine
	Sheikh Bureik (‘Abreik)	Sheikh Bureik	Kiryat Tiv'on	32°42′03″N 35°07′44″E		Active shrine	Israel
	Sheikh Ghanim	Kafr Qallil	Mount Gerizim	32°12′05″N 35°16′26″E		Reconstructed	Palestine
	Sheikh al-Katanani	Yazur	Holon	32°01′17″N 34°48′18″E		Reconstructed	Israel
	Sheikh Marzuk	‘Ulleika, Jaulan	Golan Heights	33°03′01″N 35°42′02″E		Object no longer in use	Golan Heights
	Maqam Sheikh al-Qatrawani	'Atara	'Atara	31°59′36″N 35°11′52″E	Founded in the time of the Mamluk dynasty		Palestine
	Sheikh as-Salihi	Bayt Nattif	Givat HaTurmusim, Sokho	31°40′58″N 34°57′59″E		Object no longer in use	Israel
	Sheikh ‘Usheish	Dayr Nakhkhas	Maresha Forest	31°36′39″N 34°56′01″E		Active shrine	Israel

== See also ==
- Datuk Keramat
- Imamzadeh
- Maqbara
- Marabout
- Na Tuk Kong
- Qubba
- Sidna Ali Mosque
- Sufi lodge
