= Baland Mosque =

Mosque in Bukhara, Uzbekistan

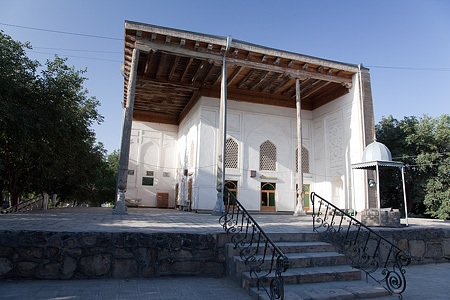

Religion
- Affiliation: Islam

Location
- Location: Bukhara, Uzbekistan
- Interactive map of Baland Mosque
- Coordinates: 39°46′18.5″N 64°24′18.2″E

Architecture
- Type: mosque
- Style: Islamic architecture Persian architecture
- Completed: 16th-century

Baland Mosque, which means the "upper mosque", is a historical mosque in the ancient city of Bukhara, Uzbekistan. Registered as a World Heritage Site by UNESCO along with the whole of the historic old town, this small mosque was built at the beginning of the 16th century in the southern part of the city.

== Architecture ==
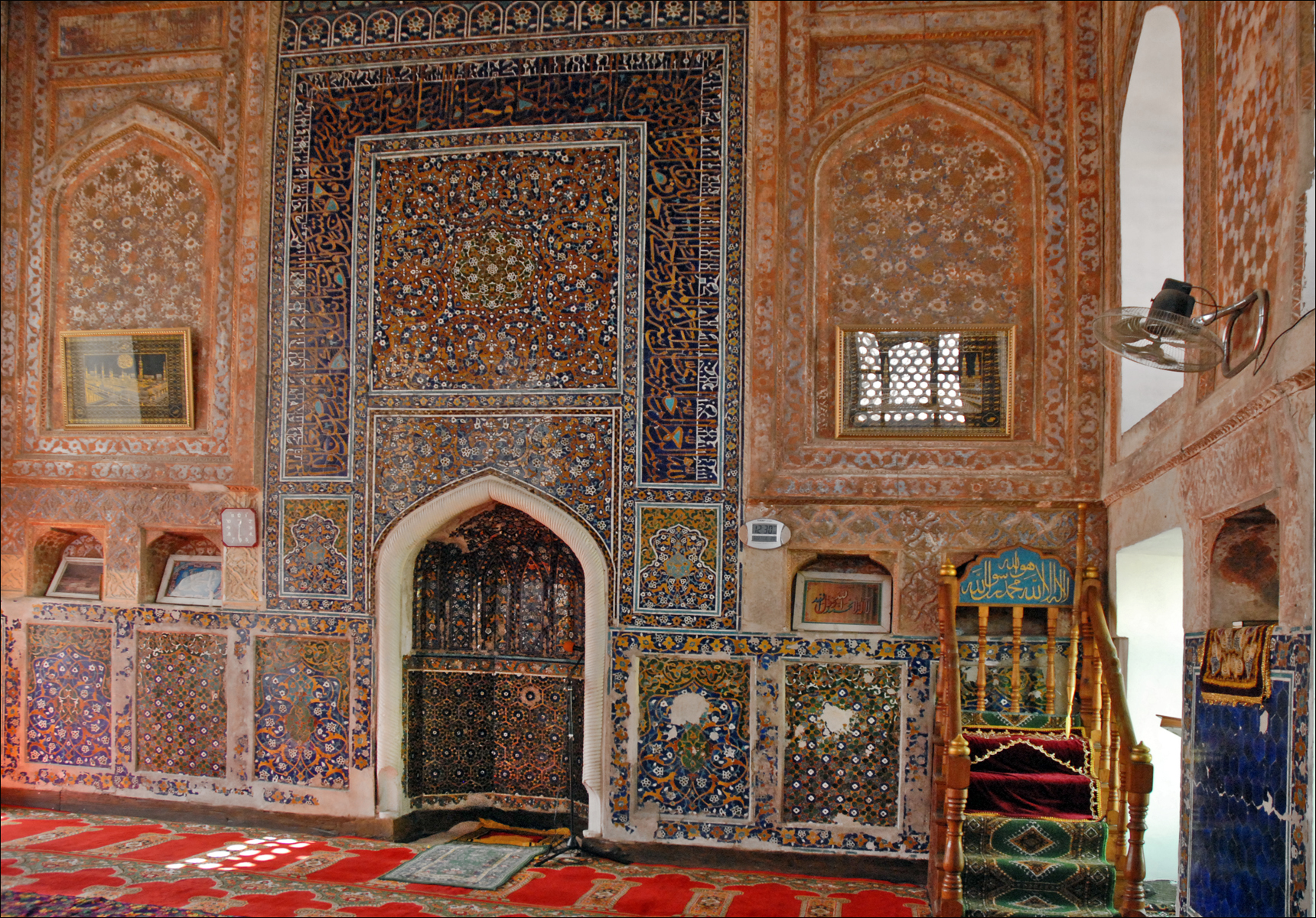
Mihrab of the mosque.

It has a prayer room for each of the winter and the summer. The first is located inside the cubic building, with an iwan outside and richly decorated interior mosaics inside. The winter room is adorned with frescoes, mosaics, gilding with floral themes. The ceiling is covered with ornate planks. A hexagonal frieze with golden inscriptions runs up the walls under the ceiling. The iwan serves as a summer prayer room. The columns of the iwan are adorned with decor of muqarnas made of wood. The ceiling and columns of the iwan date from the 19th century.

== See also ==
- List of mosques in Uzbekistan
