= Pansod Mosque =

Mosque in Shahrixon, Uzbekistan

Coordinates: 40°42′51.0″N 72°3′29.7″E

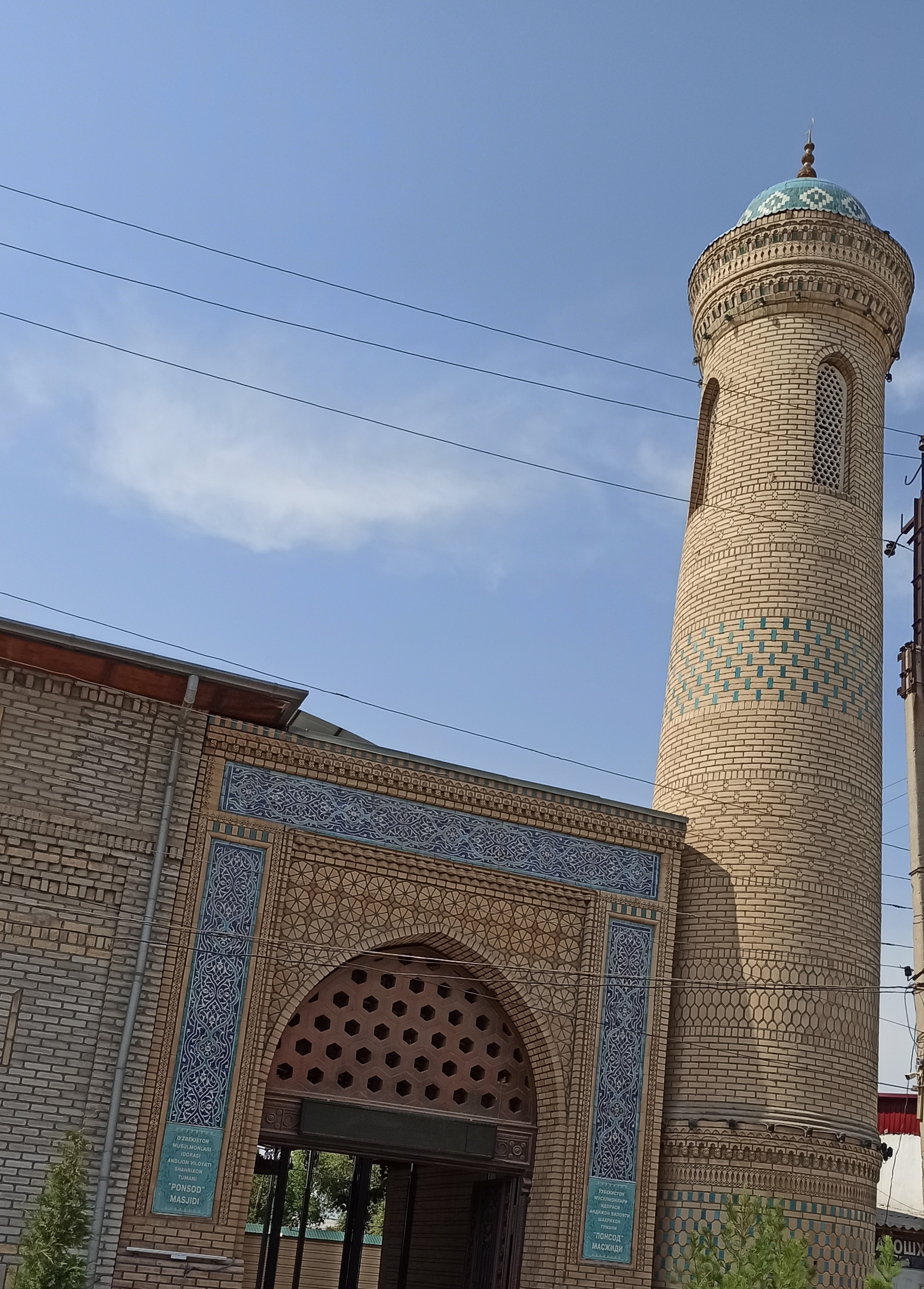

Location
- Location: Shahrixon, Uzbekistan
- Interactive map of Pansod Mosque

Architecture
- Style: Central Asian architecture

Specifications
- Length: 31 meters
- Width: 12 meters
- Minaret: 1
- Minaret height: 21 meters

Pansod Mosque is a historical monument in Shahrixon, Uzbekistan, dating back to the early 20th century. It is located 27 km away from Andijan city.

== Background ==
The mosque has a rectangular plan (31x12 m) and consists of a four-columned khanqah (a Sufi lodge), a courtyard, and a long veranda with a domed roof. The khanqah wall is decorated with carved wooden panels, and the columns are made of wood with floral patterns and muqarnas (honeycomb-like ornaments). The veranda has a wooden cornice with a zigzag pattern. The arches are set higher than the columns. The exterior of the Pansod Mosque is plastered, while the interior is covered with glazed tiles, mostly in blue and green colors. The walls are adorned with Quranic verses, geometric patterns, and floral motifs. The dome has a green background with star-shaped orange medallions. The arches have glittering pendants with Islamic inscriptions. The Pansod Mosque was built by local craftsmen, and the tiles were made by artisans from Kokand. The Pansod Mosque is notable for its unique decoration.

The construction of the mosque is attributed to a local nobleman named Matisa Pansod, who was respected by the people for his generosity and piety. Matisa Pansod was born in Shahrixon in 1825. His father, Mirzo Oghaliq, was a prominent figure in Kokand and a close adviser to Madali Khan. Matisa was a skilled commander and earned the title of Pansod, meaning “the leader of five hundred”. Matisa Pansod performed the hajj pilgrimage at the age of 63. After returning from his journey, he donated money to build the Pansod Mosque as a contribution to Islam. The mosque was completed in 1888. The mosque witnessed many events in the history of Fergana. The Shahrixon uprising of 1916 took place near the mosque. The elections for the Revolutionary Committee (Revkom) in 1919 and the first founding congress of the Uzbek SSR were held in the mosque building. Later, the mosque was neglected and abandoned due to the influence of atheism. In the 1930s, someone wrote a message on the inner wall of the mosque, urging people not to let the mosque be destroyed. A copy of this message is now an exhibit in the Shahrixon Museum.

The Pansod Mosque is a cultural heritage site of national importance and is under state protection. The mosque underwent restoration and reconstruction works for 10 years. The prayer hall, the khanqah, and the veranda were merged. The old and damaged domes were rebuilt. A 21-meter-high minaret, an arched portal, a gate, and an ablution room were added. The Pansod Mosque is included in the UNESCO list of cultural heritage sites.

The outer walls of the Pansod Mosque are not tiled, but they have carved wooden inscriptions in the style of other mosques in the Fergana Valley. The imam and preacher of the mosque is Abdurazzaqov Anvarjon (as of June 2023).
