= Memorial Complex of Imam al-Bukhari =

Islamic religious complex in Samarkand, Uzbekistan

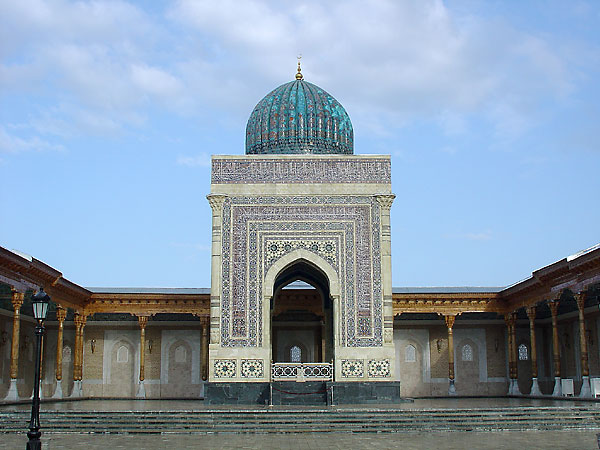
- The cenotaph of Muhammad al-Bukhari within the religious complex.
- Interactive map of Memorial Complex of Imam al-Bukhari
- 39°48′54″N 66°56′40″E
- Type: Islamic religious complex consisting of a mosque, cenotaph and library.
- Location: Samarkand, Uzbekistan

History
- Built: 1998

Site notes
- Architectural styles: Mix of modern styles and traditional Uzbek architecture

The Memorial Complex of Imam al-Bukhari (Uzbek: Imom al-Buxoriy yodgorlik majmuasi; Persian: آرامگاه امام بخاری) is an Islamic religious complex located in the district of Xo'ja Ismoil in the city of Samarkand, Uzbekistan. It mainly consists of a mosque and a memorial to Muhammad ibn Ismail al-Bukhari, the compiler of Sahih al-Bukhari, one of the canonical Hadith compilations in Sunni Islam. It is a relatively modern complex, built in the 20th-century over the ruins of a 16th-century mosque.

== History ==
Muhammad ibn Ismail al-Bukhari, compiler of the Sahih al-Bukhari, died in 870 and was buried in a cemetery in a village named Hartang near Samarkand. In the 16th century, the Shaybanids built a mosque and library near his grave as a memorial to the deceased scholar. During the Soviet occupation of Uzbekistan, the mosque was abandoned and left in a state of ruin. When the first President of Indonesia, Sukarno, visited the ruined mosque in 1961, he made a request to Nikita Khrushchev to rebuild the mosque and reopen it for both the public and visitors from abroad. Sukarno's request was granted and a new mosque and cenotaph were built at the site from 1997 to 1998.

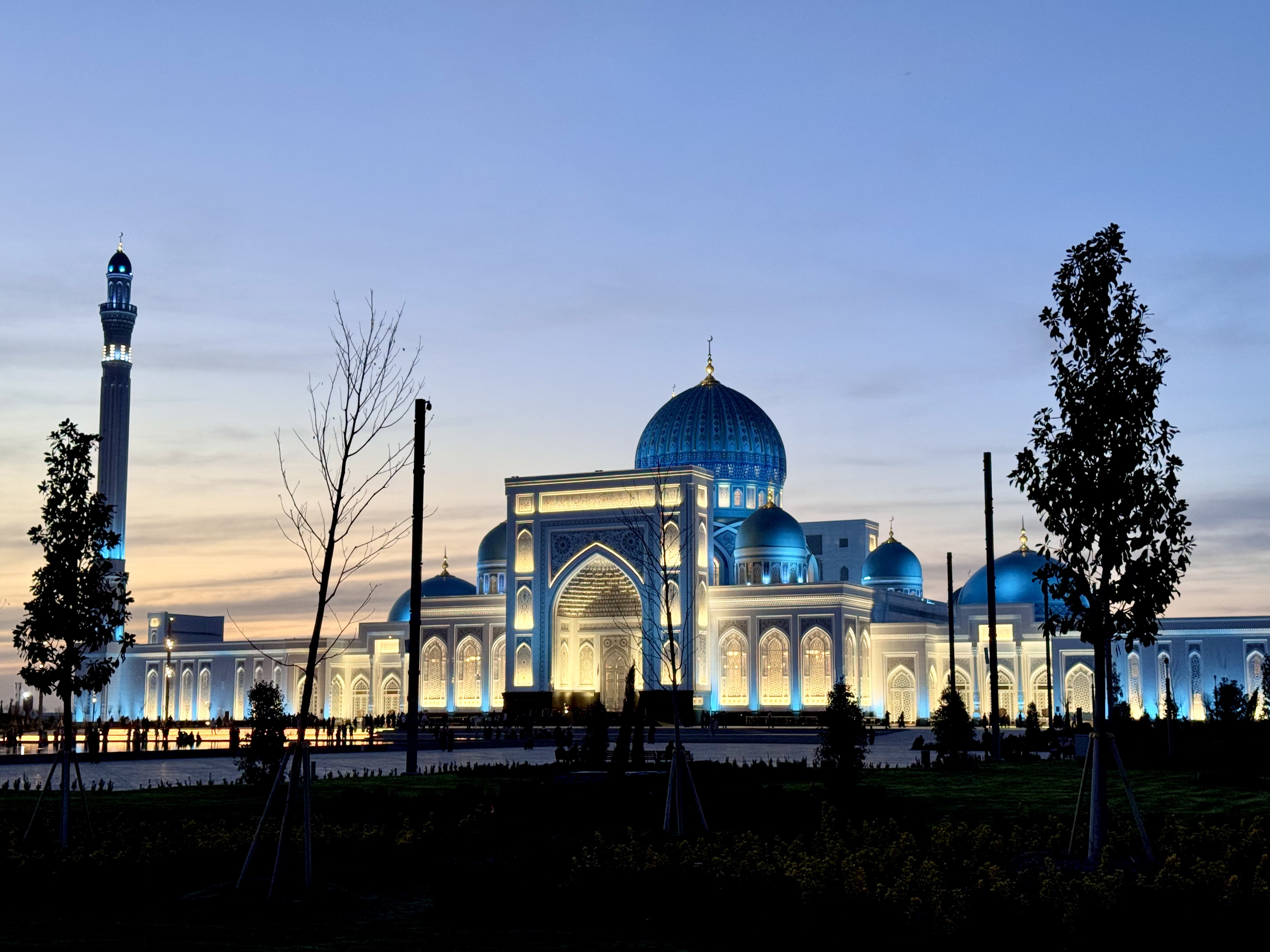
The new mosque of the religious complex.

In 2025, the religious complex was extensively renovated, while the mosque was completely rebuilt in order to accommodate more worshippers. All were reopened in the Islamic month of Ramadan in 2026.

== Architecture ==
The Memorial Complex of Imam al-Bukhari is built in a modernized architectural style while retaining classical Uzbek elements. The main buildings of the complex, which consist of a mosque, library, museum, and cenotaph, all skewer off the street parallel in the direction of Mecca.

The present mosque, built in 2025, can accommodate more than 12,000 worshippers. Made of marble, it has a square base, with a large dome topping the main prayer hall, followed by four smaller cupolas surrounding it on a lower level. Four minarets surround the mosque and the ancillary buildings that are attached to it.

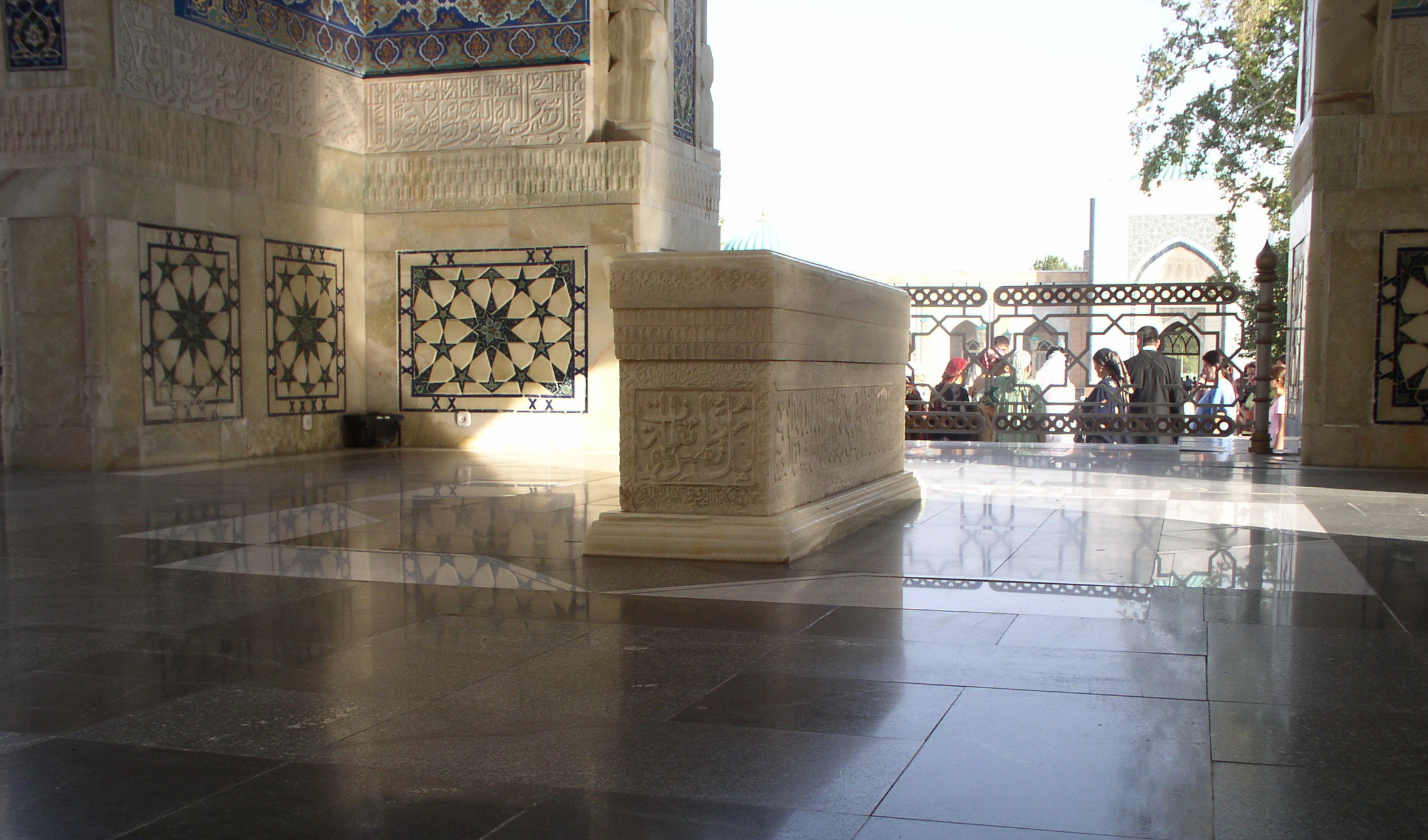
Sanduga tombstone in the cenotaph that represents a faux grave.

The cenotaph of Muhammad ibn Ismail al-Bukhari is a cuboid structure, topped by a ribbed dome. Each wall has an iwan leading into the structure. Steel grilles fill up the empty spaces in the iwans that are not in use. The tombstone of the scholar, a rectangular sanduga, is mounted in the centre. It is not the real grave of Ibn Ismail, who wished to be buried in a modest and flat grave. He is instead interred in a crypt near the mosque, where the cloth-wrapped sarcophagus of the scholar can be found.

Other ancillary establishments next to the complex include a cemetery, park, toilets, hotel, tourist centre, as well as a madrasa.

== See also ==
- List of mosques in Uzbekistan
