= Toqi Telpak Furushon =

Bazaar in Bukhara, Uzbekistan

- Toqi Telpakfurushon
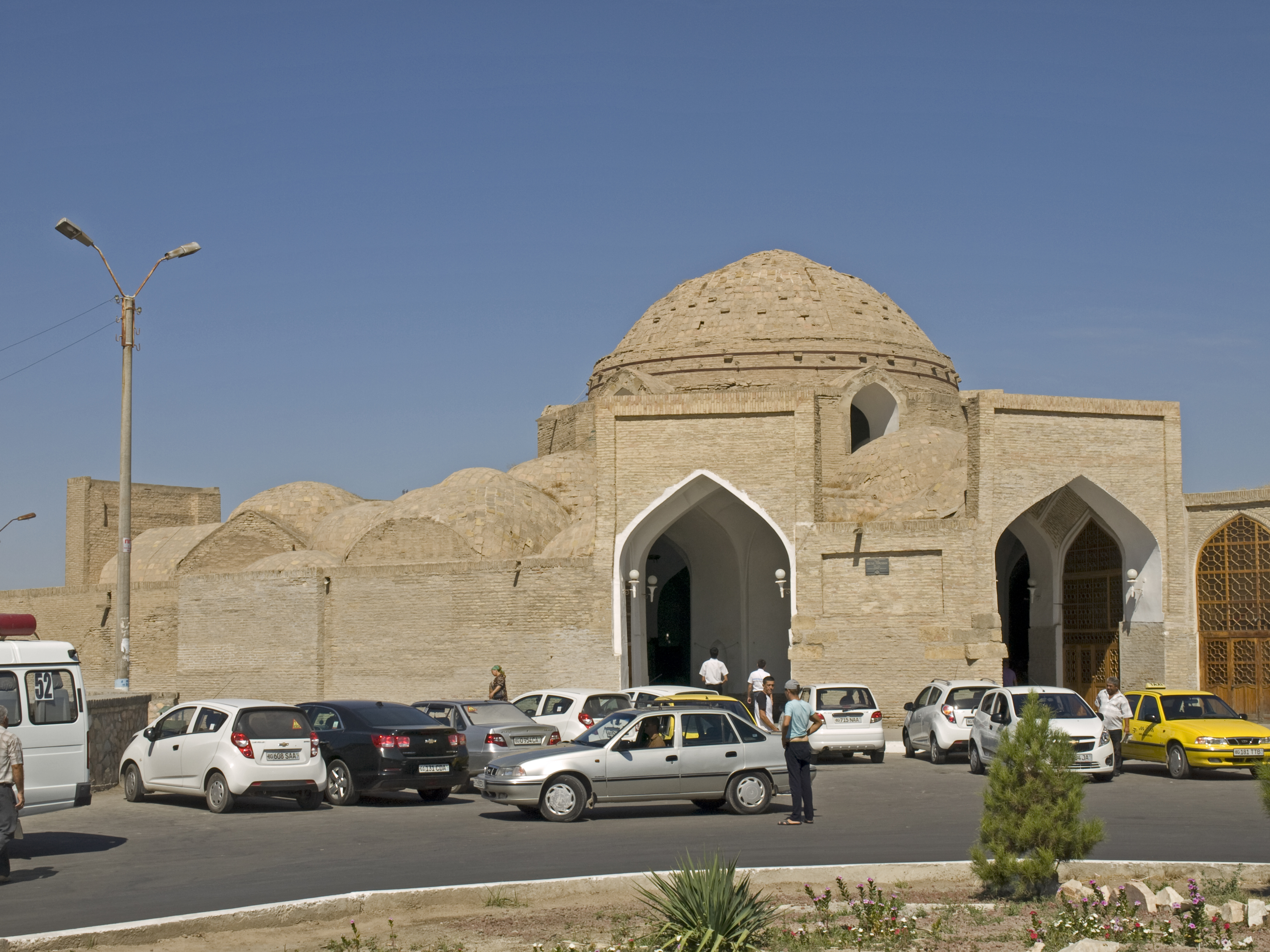
- Interactive map of Toqi Telpak Furushon
- Location: Bukhara, Uzbekistan
- Coordinates: 39°46′25″N 64°25′02″E
- Type: Bazaar
- Beginning date: 1570; 456 years ago
- Completion date: 1571; 455 years ago

The Toqi Telpak Furushon (Uzbek: Toqi Telpakfurushon) is a bazaar located in Bukhara, which forms part of its historic centre. This architectural monument was built in 1571 during the reign of Shaibani ruler Abdullah Khan II. Currently, it is included in the national list of real estate objects of material and cultural heritage of Uzbekistan.

== History ==
The Toqi Telpak Furushon was built between 1570 and 1571. Toqi Tepakfurushon was constructed during the reign of the Shaybanid ruler Abdullaxon II in the 16th century and was located in close proximity to the marketplace in Bukhara. In the middle centuries, various names were given to this place over time. It was known for selling different items such as fur hats, sheepskin coats, magnificent fabrics, and exotic turbans. The name "Toqi Tepakfurushon" has been associated with this marketplace in different eras. The Toqi Tepakfurushon dome is preserved and prominent, making it second in size in that direction. For example, it has been known by names like "Choharsuyi Oxan", "Toqi Kitobfurushon", and "Toqi Khwaja Muhammad Parron". Later names include "Toqi Allofi" and "Toqi Ordfurushon". During the middle centuries, booksellers' shops were also present in the marketplace. In the vicinity of Toqi Tepakfurushon, there are currently ironworking shops and bathhouses. Nowadays, Toqi Telpakfurushon hosts trade stalls and craft workshops. In the years of independence, Toqi Telpakfurushon underwent renovations.

== Architecture ==
Toqi Tepakfurushon is constructed from adobe, timber, stone, and clay. The building's architect brilliantly connected five arched niches, shaped like alcoves, in an orderly and symmetrical arrangement, combining them into a central dome with arched doors. The dome is still intact, with entrances. This building has a unique hexagonal structure, and its central dome has doorways. Toqi Tepakfurushon serves as a showcase for the shops that sell various traditional clothing, jewelry, and other types of attire. According to waqf documents, it was constructed between 1570 and 1571, with the junction of the five arches visible on different sides. The main dome has six tiers of walls, and the surroundings are surrounded by smaller domes. The main dome has a diameter of 38 meters, a height of 10 meters to the springing of the vault, a square shopping area of 28 meters, and a street width of 14 meters. In the past, the area beneath the dome was occupied by clothing and book merchants.

== Location ==
Toqi Telpak Furushon is located about 300 meters south of Toqi Zargaron, at a point where five streets meet. About 10 meters to the west and south is the Magok-i-Kurpa Mosque.
