= Sanduga =

Style of tombstone from Azerbaijan

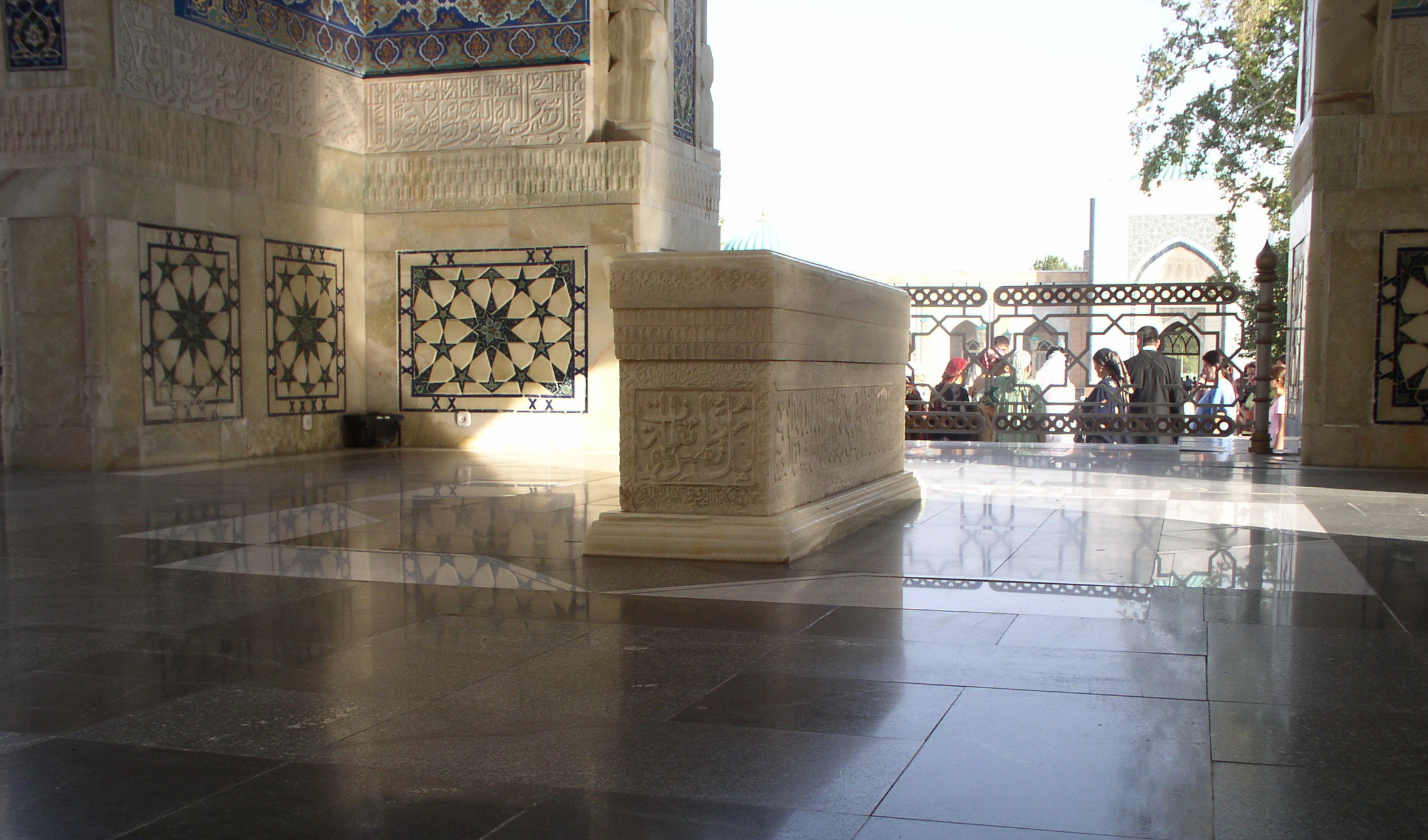
An example of a sanduga in the Memorial Complex of Imam al-Bukhari in Bukhara.

A Sanduga (Azerbaijani: Sənduqə, Arabic: صندوقة; literally "tombstone chest") is a type of tombstone that is erected atop a grave, originating during Islamic rule in Azerbaijan, although similar styles are present in Timurid era monuments in Uzbekistan and later in Ottoman Turkey. Typical sanduga are made of concrete or limestone and are created in a rectangular form, with an exterior rich in detailed carvings. Such carvings are usually geometric patterns combined with Arabic calligraphy, the latter which is often Qur'anic verses and sometimes a eulogy about the entombed person. After the Soviet occupation of Azerbaijan, the practice of Sanduga was discontinued, while a large number of such tombstones at cemeteries in mountainous and rural areas were destroyed, either due to modernization or due to lack of care resulting in dilapidation.

A group of Sanduga is currently held in the private collection of the National Museum of History of Azerbaijan.

== See also ==
- Tombstone
- Islamic funerary practices
