= Bolo Haouz Mosque =

Mosque in Bukhara, Uzbekistan

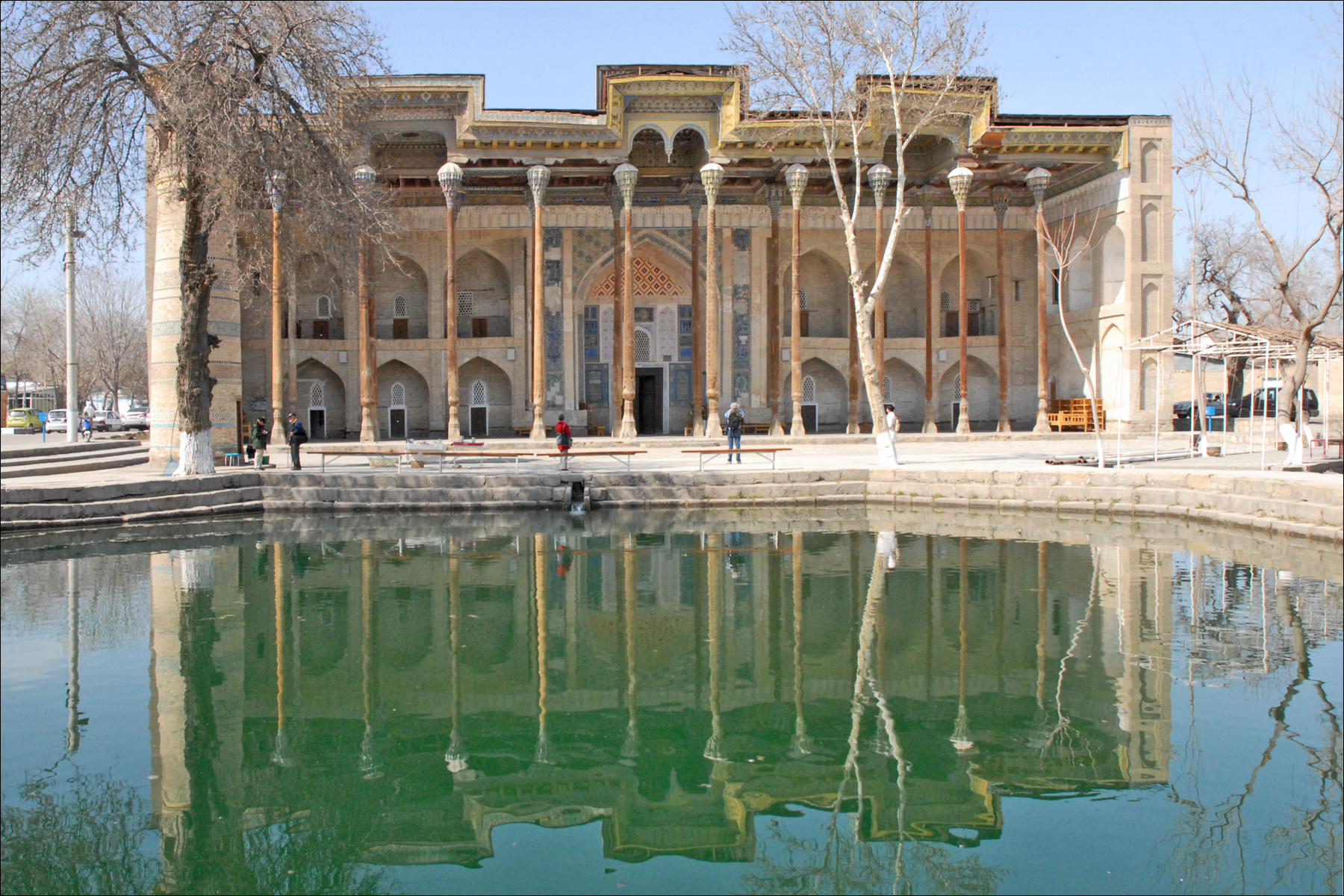
- Facade of the mosque with iwan on the back, columns on the front decorated with muqarnas and howz in the foreground.

Religion
- Affiliation: Islam

Location
- Location: Bukhara, Uzbekistan
- Interactive map of Bolo Haouz Mosque
- Coordinates: 39°46′40″N 64°24′27″E

Architecture
- Type: mosque
- Style: Islamic architecture
- Completed: 1712

Bolo Haouz Mosque is a historical mosque in Bukhara, Uzbekistan. Built in 1712, on the opposite side of the citadel of Ark in Registan district, it is inscribed in the UNESCO World Heritage Site list along with other parts of the historic city. It served as a Friday mosque during the time when the emir of Bukhara was being subjugated under the Bolshevik Russian rule in the 1920s. Thin columns made of painted wood were added to the frontal part of the iwan (entrance) in 1917, additionally supporting the bulged roof of summer prayer room. The columns are decorated with colored muqarnas.

== Architecture ==
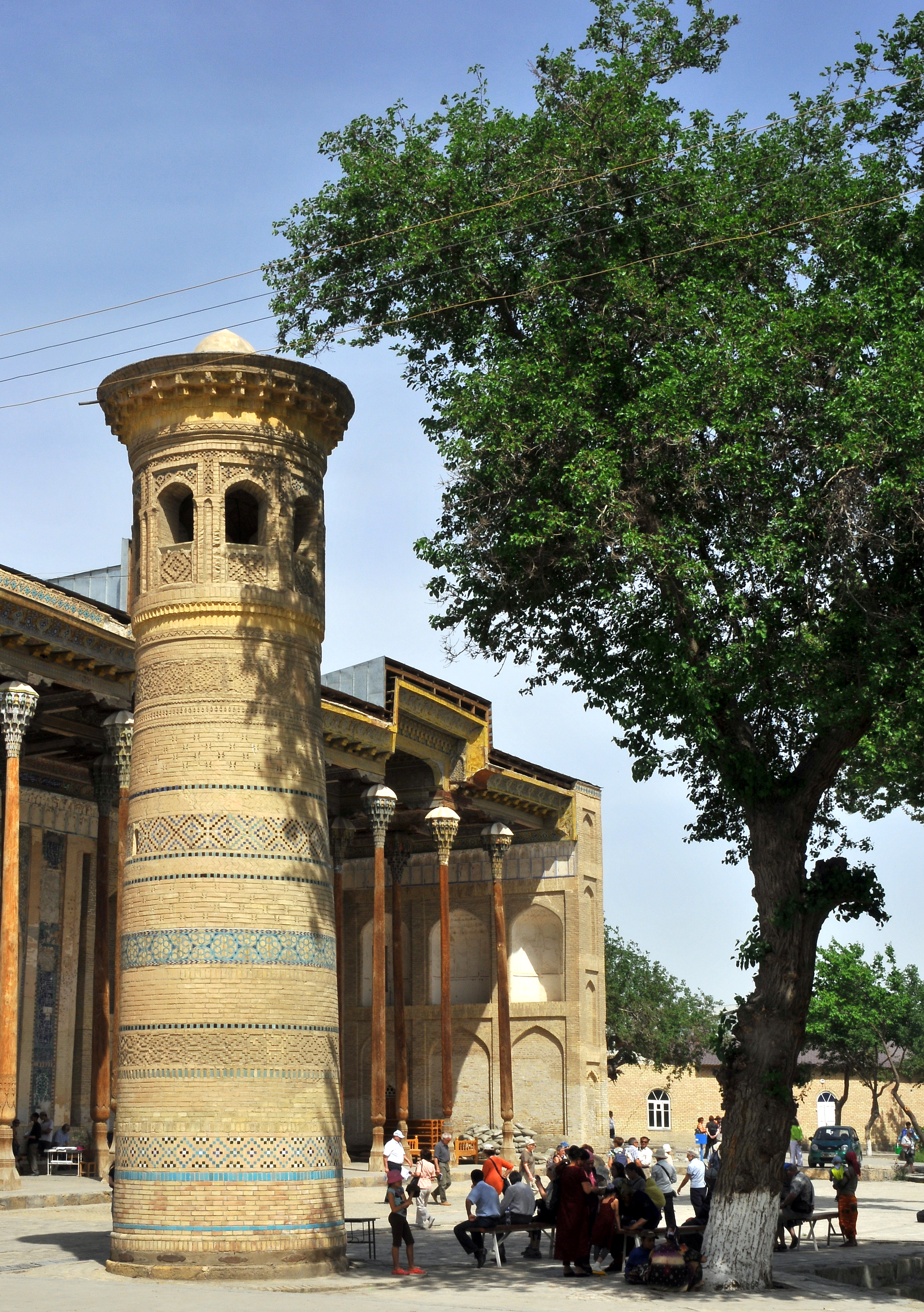
Minaret of the mosque

The mosque is rectangular shaped. The prayer room during the winter time is a room with four columns and several entrances. The 12-meter-high iwan, comprising a 20-pillared hall measuring 42 x 10 meters, and bordered by bulged roofs sustained with twenty wood columns, serves as a summer prayer room attached to the three sides of the winter hall. The wooden columns rest on concrete foundation. The interior of the mosque is typical 18th-century Central Asian style.

In front of the mosque is an octagonally shaped howz, or artificial pond, which likely dates back to the time of construction of the mosque when such reservoirs served as water sources for the population. To the right, there is a short minaret built in 1916-1917, which has multiple bands of brickwork alternating with blue glazed tiles in a variety of geometric designs.
