= Kalan Mosque =

Mosque in Bukhara, Uzbekistan

- Masjidi Kalon
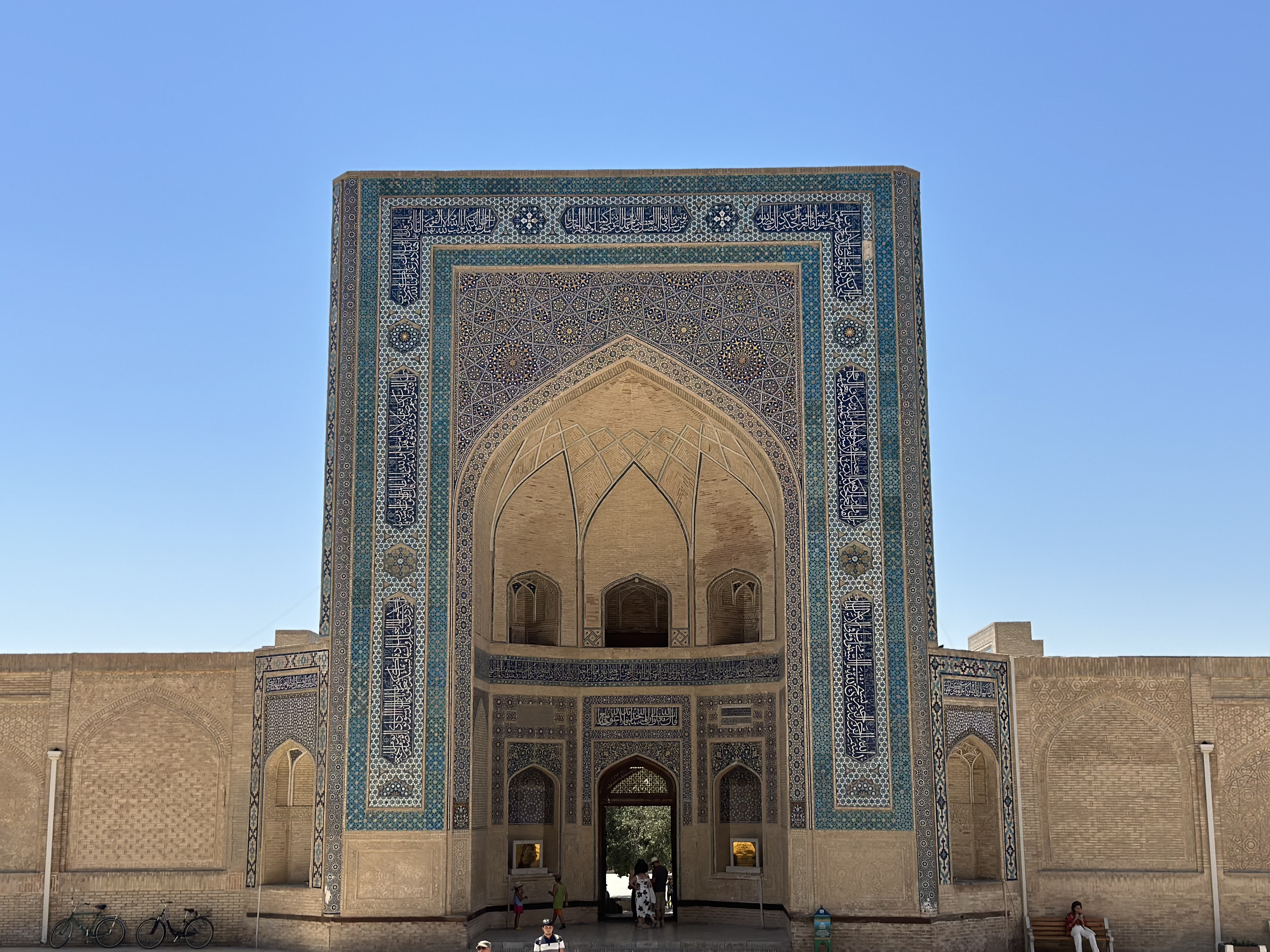
- Interactive map of the Kalan Mosque area

General information
- Location: Bukhara, Uzbekistan
- Coordinates: 39.7759°N 64.4141°E
- Construction started: 12th century
- Completed: 1514

Technical details
- Material: brick, wood, concrete
- Size: 127x78 m
- Floor count: 1

Kalan Mosque (Persian: مسجد کلان, romanized: masjed-e kalân, lit. 'big mosque') is an architectural monument located in Bukhara, Uzbekistan. It was considered one of the largest mosques built on the place of Jame' Mosque. Its current appearance was built in 1514 during the reign of Shaybani Ubaidullah Khan of Bukhara.

Currently, the mosque is included in the national list of estate real objects of material and cultural heritage of Uzbekistan.

== History ==
The main part of the Kalan Mosque was built in the 12th century during the reign of Arslan Khan, one of the Karakhanid rulers. The construction of the mosque was completed in 1514 during the reign of Shaibani Ubaidullah Khan. During the reign of Ubaidullah Khan, major repairs were carried out in the eastern main facade of the mosque. In 1542, in front of the main gate of the mosque, a marble stone was placed with the text of the decree of Bukhara Khan Abdulaziz Khan to exempt the residents of Bukhara from taxes. This work was done by the calligrapher Mirshaikh al-Pourani. This mosque is located in the Po-i-Kalyan complex. The complex includes Kalyan Minaret, Kalan Mosque, Miri Arab and Amir Olim Khan Madrasah. Kalan Mosque has a front porch decorated with wall arches. Some of the mosque's decorations have been preserved and restored. It was found that there is a decoration made of six-sided plates associated with the name of the master Bayazid Puroni and borders dating back to the 15th century under the cover of the front part of the mosque. At the beginning of the 20th century, on the initiative of Usta Shirin Murodov, an octagonal dome was built according to the old appearance of the mosque. In 1935, the Kalan Mosque was used as a granary and Friday prayers were held at the Miri Arab Madrasah. In 1997, on the occasion of the 2500th anniversary of the city of Bukhara, Kalan Mosque was renovated according to the decree of the first president of the Republic of Uzbekistan, Islam Karimov. Currently, the mosque is operating.

== Architecture ==
The mosque has a rectangular layout (127x78 m), a large courtyard is surrounded by a covered porch with domes. 288 domes supported by 208 columns. There are decorated iwans in the four sides of the yard. The outer huge iwan in the east stands out for its majesty and magnificent decoration. There are 7 outer gates of the Kalan Mosque, with wide verandas in front of and inside the main eastern gate.

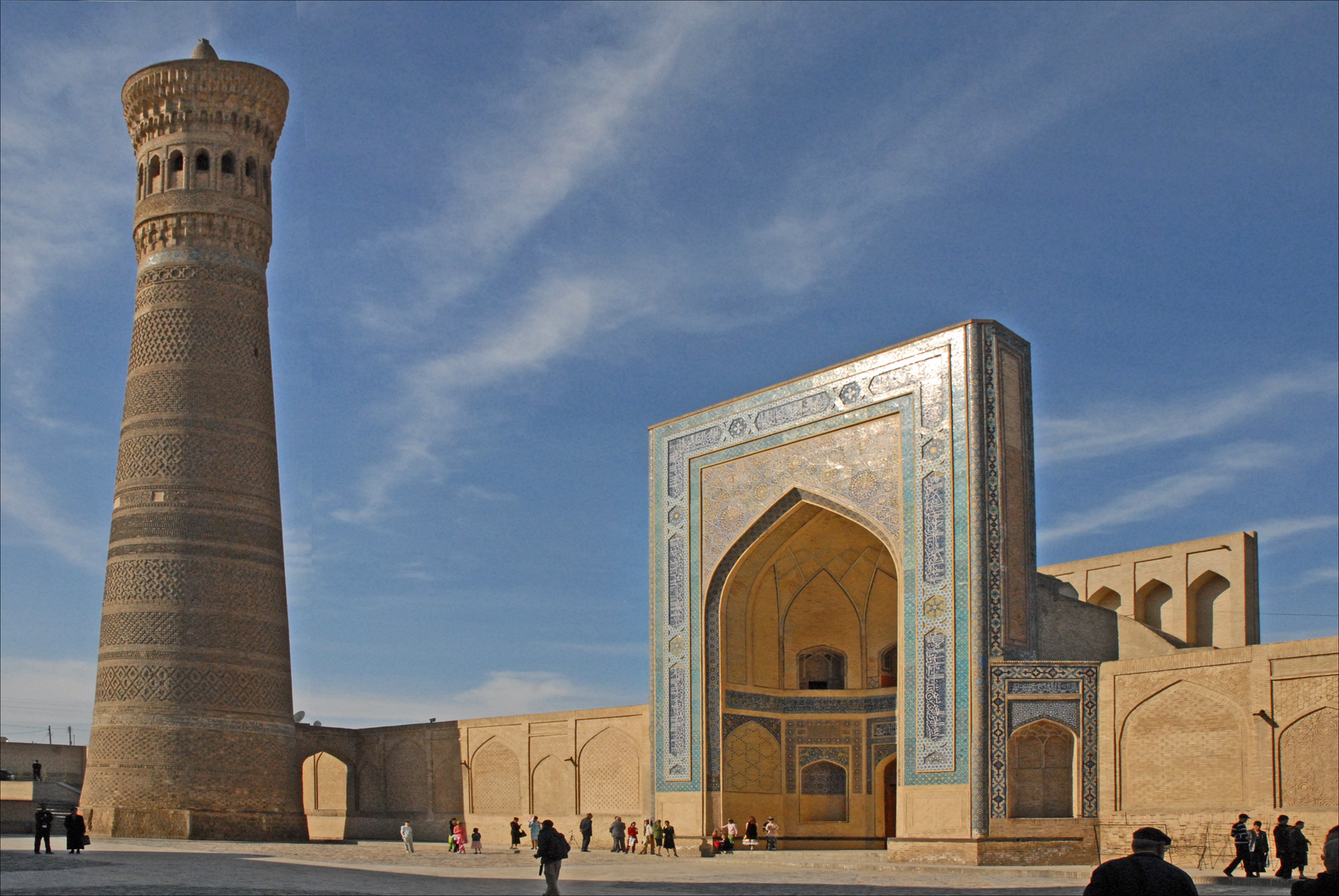
Kalyan Minaret and Kalan Mosque

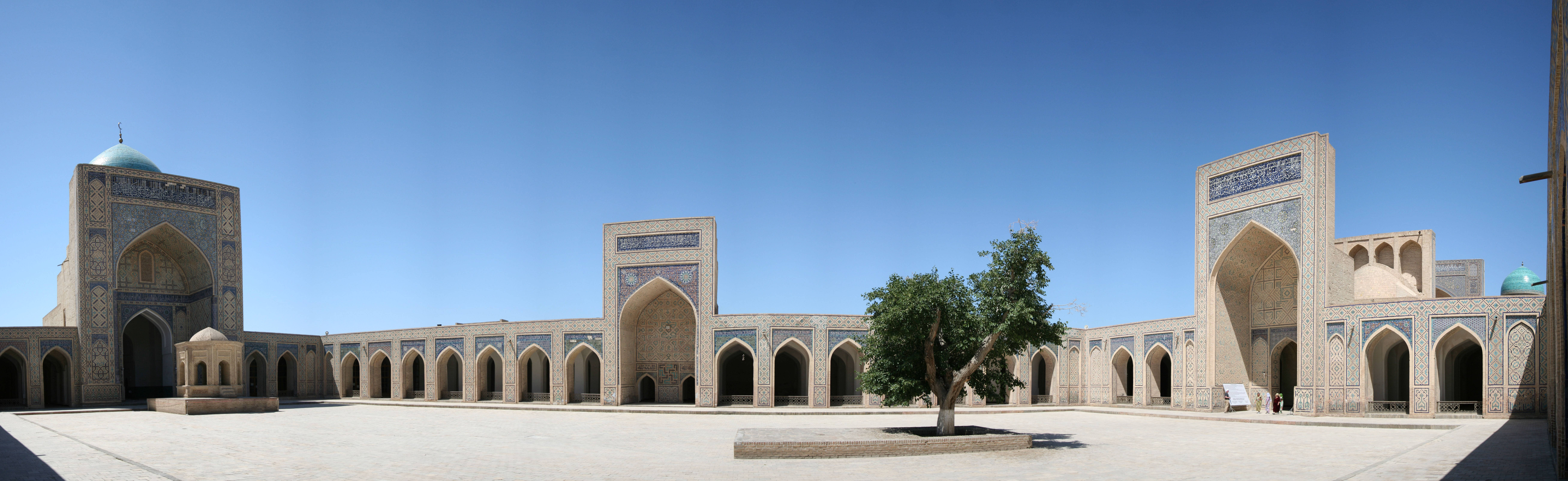
Inner courtyard of the Kalyan Mosque, part of the Po-i-Kalyan Complex in Bukhara, Uzbekistan
