= Muso Saidjonov =

Uzbek professor

- Born: Muso Yoldoshevich Saidjonov; 1893; Bukhara, Emirate of Bukhara
- Died: October 25, 1937; Tashkent, Uzbek SSR
- Occupations: State and public figure, educator, historian, orientalist, numismatist, archaeologist
- Years active: 1913–1937
- Known for: Jadid movement, Bukharan People’s Soviet Republic, preservation of historical monuments
- Notable work: The History of Architectural Monuments of Shahrisabz, The Architectural Monuments of Samarkand, The Waqf Document of Shaykh Saifuddin Boharzi

Muso Yoldoshevich Saidjonov (1893 – October 25, 1937) was an Uzbek state and public figure. He was a representative of the Jadid movement in Bukhara, an educator, a historian, an orientalist and a numismatist, an archaeologist-professor. He was one of the first Uzbek professors.

== Background ==
Muso Saidjonov's grandfather, Saidboy Qorakoʻlfurush, was one of the largest merchants in the caravan route of the capital of the Emirate of Bukhara. He traded in leather, wool, silk, and cotton, and owned large land plots, which he rented out to local peasants for income. Saidboy Qorakoʻlfurush traveled to Russia, China, Germany and other major countries with his trade caravans, and bought land with his profits. In particular, he had a four-story hotel in the Berlin. Bukharan traders stayed at this hotel when they went to Berlin. Qorakoʻlfurush also spent some of his trade profits on charitable works; when he traveled to China, he would regularly go to the market and buy out the representatives of the Central Asian peoples who were enslaved, and free them when he returned to Bukhara.

Muso Saidjonov's father, Yoldoshboy, often traveled to Russia and China, trading in leather at the Moscow and Uyghur fairs. He died of a heart disease at the age of 47, when Muso was in elementary school.

== History ==
Yoldoshboy's son Muso was enrolled in an elementary school that operated near the mosque of Khoja Abdullayi Safedmun in Bukhara. In the first year of his education at the school, Muso learned the Arabic alphabet and Persian orthography, and in the second year he memorized the Haftiyak, a special textbook for learning the Quranic verses, and then began to study the Quran directly. He completed his elementary education in five years and became literate.

Muso Saidjonov finished the elementary school at the age of 12, and then studied for 4 years at the Mir Arab madrasa in Bukhara, where he learned Arabic to a perfect level from a private teacher, Mulla Abdusalom. Later, he worked as a salesman at his brother Qurbon Saidjonov's shop for a while.

Muso Saidjonov started studying at the Russian-native school in New Bukhara in 1904. He learned Russian language and literature, the history of the Russian Empire and the world, the current Russian law, arithmetic, geometry, geography, medicine, drawing and other subjects at the secondary education level, and graduated from the school in 1908. The director of the Russian-native school at that time was Vasiliy Vyatkin.

He joined the Young Bukharans party in 1913. He left Bukhara after the Kolesov incident. After graduating from the teachers' institute in Tashkent, he taught in Khujand and participated in theater groups. After the establishment of the Bukharan People's Soviet Republic (BPSR), Saidjonov was the minister of food (September 1920 – March 1921), the deputy minister of economy (March – August 1921), the minister of state control (October 1921 – January 1922), the chairman of the Cheka (Extraordinary Commission) (August – September 1921), the minister of finance (February – April 1922), the deputy chairman of the Supreme Council of National Economy (October 1922 – 1923), and the minister of education (June 1923 – 1924).

He was one of the initiators of sending Bukharan students to study in Germany. He was involved in the activities of the "National Union" organization and had close relations with A. Z. Validi. Saidjonov also actively participated in the establishment of the Bukharan Scientific Society (1921) and the organization of educational institutions, the preservation of architectural monuments, the collection and ordering of historical manuscripts, and the gathering of examples of folk oral literature in the BPSR. He was the chairman of the committee for the preservation of historical monuments of Uzbekistan, and the scientific employee of its Samarkand branch (1925–36). He was one of the first Uzbek scholars to attend the 3rd congress of orientalists in Leningrad (1935) and gave a scientific lecture on the Kokchunchikhon mausoleum. He was awarded the title of professor for his scientific work. He was the author of works such as "The History of Architectural Monuments of Shahrisabz", "The Architectural Monuments of Samarkand", and "The Waqf Document of Shaykh Saifuddin Boharzi".

Saidjonov was arrested (April 13, 1937) and executed in Samarkand by the Soviet regime for his impartial research on the history of Uzbek statehood, his respect for the cultural heritage, and his involvement in the activities of the "National Union" organization. He was rehabilitated on December 2, 1965.
