= Khoja Nihol Madrasah =

Madrasa in Bukhara, Uzbekistan

General information
- Architectural style: Central Asian architecture
- Location: Bukhara, Uzbekistan

Technical details
- Material: brick and wood stone and ganch.

Khoja Nihol Madrasah was a historical monument built in Bukhara, Uzbekistan. The madrasah has not been preserved today.

The Khoja Nihal madrasa was built by Khoja Muhammad Nihal ibn Khoja Abdullah in the 18th century in Tirgaron, during the Ashtarkhani ruler Muhammad Ubaidullah Khan. The madrasah was built of brick and wood on Iskandar Khan Mosque street and near Chorsukhi and Qazikhana. On the eastern side of the madrasa was a large classroom, an indoor and outdoor area, a winter and a summer mosque, and the upper part consists of several domes and archways. To the west of the madrasa was the Chorsuqi sangin madrasah, to the north was the street, to the east was the Iskandar Khan mosque, and to the south was the yard of Babajan ibn Abdullah and Baqijan ibn Abdurahim.

Khoja Nihal madrasah belonged to the fourth level of the higher category and was taught by a mufti. According to Abdurauf Fitrat, the annual endowment of the madrasa was 50,000 tenge. Research scientist Abdusattor Jumanazarov studied a number of foundation documents related to this madrasa and provided information related to the madrasah. Abdusattor Jumanazarov wrote that the annual endowment of the madrasa is even more. Many properties were endowed for madrasa foundation. There was also a large library in front of the madrasa. Hundreds of volumes of books were collected in this library, and some of them were listed in the documents of the foundation. Khoja Muhammad Nihal was one of the famous people in the palace during the reign of Ashtarkhani rulers Subhanquli Khan and Muhammad Ubaidullah Khan. He was appointed to the palace by Ubaidullah Khan during the Ashtarkhanid period. Sadri Zia wrote that there were 25 rooms in this madrasa.

== See also ==
- Ayozbii Madrasah
- Amir Muzaffar Madrasah
- Amir Olim Khan Madrasah
