= Tower of death =

Tower of death may refer to:

- Kalyan minaret, also known as the Tower of Death.
- Game of Death II, a 1981 martial arts film also known as Tower of Death
