= Battle of Jam =

1528 battle in Zurabad, Khorasan

- Part of Persian–Uzbek wars
Date	September 24, 1528
Location	Zurabad, Khorasan; 36°44′09″N 57°20′33″E
Result	Safavid victory

Belligerents
Safavid Iran	Khanate of Bukhara

Commanders and leaders
Tahmasp I Bahram Mirza; Alqas Mirza	Ubaidullah Khan (WIA); Kuchkunji Khan (AWOL)

Strength
40,000	180,000 men 120,000 fighters 80,000–7,000 elite troops Clergy of the Dervish

Casualties and losses
Unknown	20,000 Killed; Half of the army fled

The Battle of Jam (Persian: نبرد جام) was one of the first battles in the reign of Shah Tahmasp I and one of the first conflicts against the Uzbeks after the Battle of Merv.

== Background ==
Following the death of Shah Ismail I, the crown passed to his son Tahmasp I, who was only 11 years old. During his early reign, a civil war broke out within the Safavid Empire among the Qizilbash, who formed the backbone of the army. Taking advantage of this internal chaos, the Shaybanids launched an invasion to overthrow Safavid rule, sending campaigns into Khorasan led by Ubaydullah Khan. He mobilized 120,000 fighters, including 80,000 elite troops, and reportedly brought 40 religious scholars with him. Upon hearing this, Shah Tahmasp I prepared a force of 40,000 men equipped in the Ottoman style, utilizing wagons, cannons and muskets. As the Shaybanids began their campaign, they advanced.

== Battle ==
In September 1528, the two sides met. Ubaydullah Khan's army numbered 180,000, including dervishes and scholars who viewed the campaign as a Holy War. Facing them, Shah Tahmasp led a much smaller force of 7,000 elite troops. Despite being outnumbered, he skillfully employed the 'wagon-laager' tactic and cannons, influenced by Ottoman military styles.

Initially, the Shaybanids gained the upper hand. Believing they had won, the Uzbek soldiers scattered to collect spoils of war and eventually fell asleep. Seizing the moment, Shah Tahmasp launched a daring night raid on the heart of the sleeping camp. During the chaos, a Qurchi soldier struck Ubaydullah Khan with a sword, wounding him. However, amidst the turmoil, the soldier couldn't deliver a fatal blow, allowing the Uzbeks to carry their leader and flee. Ultimately the Safavids emerged victorious.

== Aftermath ==
In 1528, the Uzbek threat reached its peak when Ubaydullah Khan recaptured Astarabad and Mashhad, eventually besieging Herat. Despite being only fourteen, Shah Tahmasp led a relief force and distinguished himself at the Battle of Jam (September 24, 1528). The Safavid victory was largely due to the innovative use of gunpowder technology on this frontier. However, this triumph was short-lived Tahmasp had to rush west to suppress a revolt in Baghdad led by Zulfiqar Mawsillu. This distraction allowed the Uzbeks to return to Khorasan, where Herat was eventually surrendered in exchange for safe passage. By late 1530, the Safavids managed to expel the Uzbeks again, but internal friction grew. The 'brinkmanship' policy of the Takalu tribe led to a violent clash within the royal tent, forcing the Shah to execute the Takalu leaders in a purge known as the Takalu Plague. This marked a turning point, as it paved the way for subsequent events that further res

haped the empire's internal power structure.

== See also ==
- Persian–Uzbek wars
- Battle of Merv
- Uzbek invasion of Khorasan (1578)
