= Abu Sa'id Khan =

4th Khan of Samarkand from the Shaybanid dynasty

- Khan of Samarkand
- Reign: 1530–1533
- Predecessor: Kuchkunji Khan
- Successor: Ubaydullah Khan
- Born: unknown
- Died: 1533
- Dynasty: Shaybanid
- Father: Kuchkunji Khan

Abu Sa'id Khan (XV-1533) - 4th Khan of Samarkand from the Shaybanid dynasty (1530–1533), the eldest son of Kuchkunji Khan.

== Biography ==
There is no information about the birth and early years of Abu Said Sultan. Considering that he ascended the throne after the death of his father, Kuchkunchi Khan, he was older than Ubaydullah Khan, who was born in 1486/7. He also had brothers named Abdullah I and Abdul-latif Sultan.

When Shaybani Khan was besieged by the Qizilbashs in the fortress of Merv, Abu Sa'id sultan is said to have set out with his father for help. In 1512, Abu Sa'id, together with Muhammad Temur sultan and Fulad sultan, set out from Samarkand to Bukhara against the Qizilbashs and entered the fortress of Ghazdewan and organized a defense. In November 1512, Abu Sa'id and Timur sultan joined the army of Ubaydullah Khan and fought against Najm-e Sani near Ghazdewan, contributing to the defeat of the enemy

Abu Sa'id sultan became the heir to the throne after the death of Jani beg sultan. After the death of his father, Kuchkunji Khan (December 1529 or March 1530), Abu Sa'id ascended the throne of Samarkand and died in 1533 after a short reign.
