= Ubaidullah Khan =

Khan of Bukhara from 1534 to 1539

Ubaidullah Khan عبیدالله خان
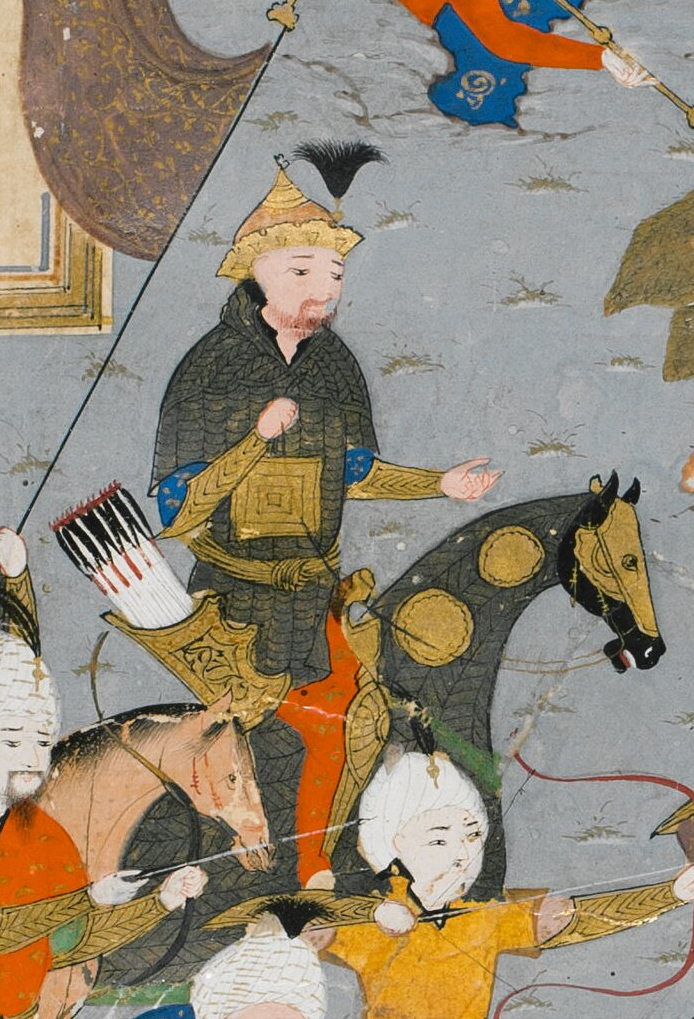
- Ubaid Khan Uzbek. Battle near Sarikamish on 24 September 1524, against Tahmasp I. c. 1595 miniature.

Khan of the Bukhara Khanate
- Reign: 1534–1539
- Predecessor: Abu Sa'id Khan
- Successor: Abdullah I ibn Kuchkunchi Muhammad
- Born: 1487
- Died: 1539 (aged 51–52)
- House: Borjigin
- Dynasty: Shaybanids
- Father: Mahmud

Ubaidullah Khan (Chagatai/Persian: عبیدالله خان; 1487–1539), also Ubaid Khan, was the 4th Shaybanid Khan of Bukhara, who ruled between 1534 and 1539. He was the son of Mahmud and nephew of Muhammad Shaybani, founder of the Shaybanid dynasty.

== Biography ==
After the death of Muhammad Shaybani in 1510, the cities and lands controlled by the Uzbeks were divided among the family members. Bukhara fell to Ubaidullah Khan, which he had to defend against Babur Emir of Kabul and future Mughal Emperor, and against the Safavids of Iran in 1511–1512. Ubaidullah and Jani Beg, the commander-in-chief of the army, proved themselves as capable generals. Babur's defeat at Gadjdivan in 1512 finally secured the Uzbeks' possession of the land between Amu Darya and Syr Darya.

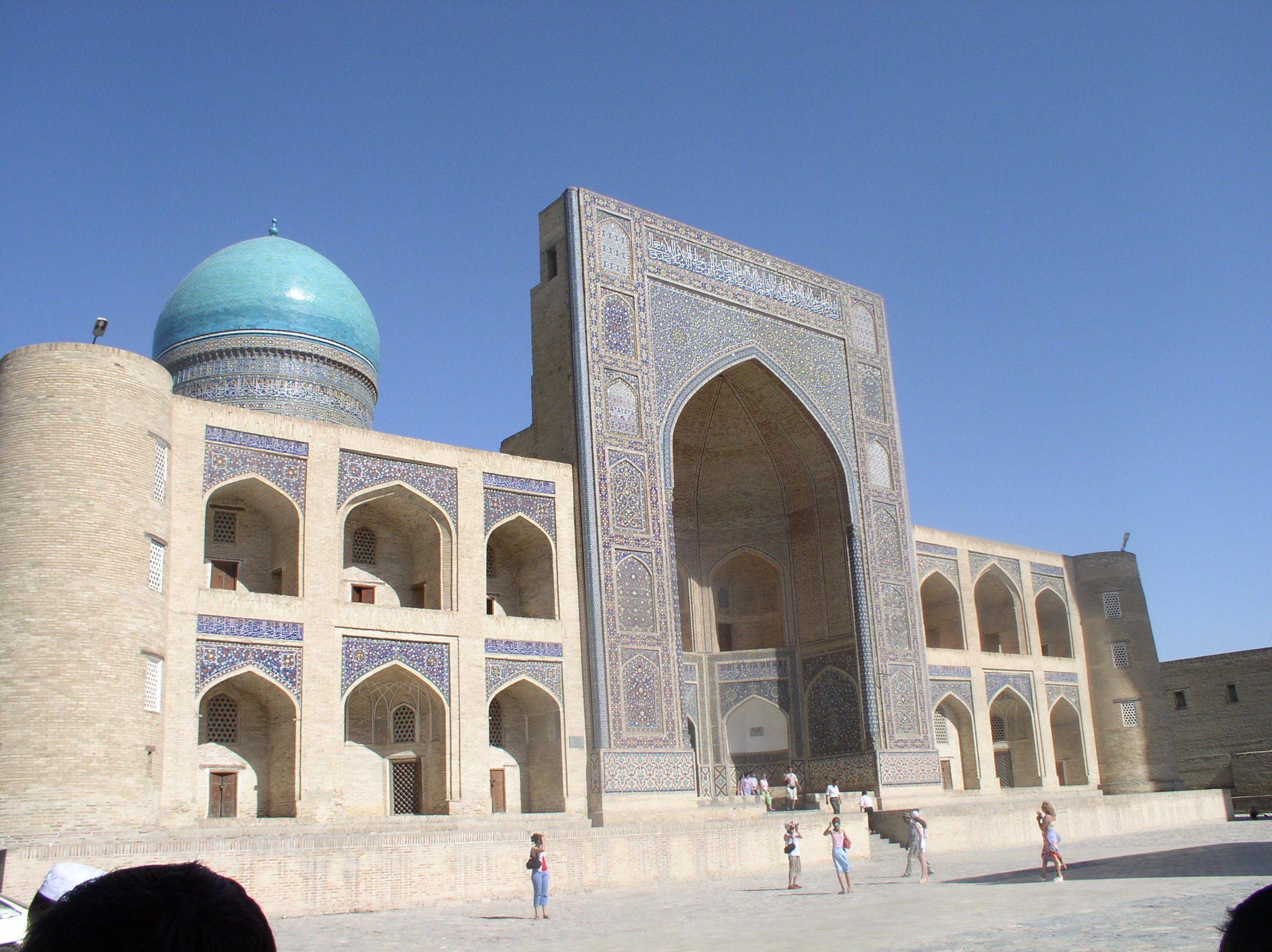
Mir Arab Madrasa built in 1536 under Ubaidullah Khan.

Ubaidullah was not only a military man and politician, but also an amateur scholar, poet and builder. His time saw the construction of the Kalan Mosque in 1514, next to the Kalyan Minaret from the 12th century on the site of an old palace mosque, and the construction of the Mir Arab Madrasa (1535–1536) in Bukhara. The madrasa was financed by Ubaidullah by selling 3,000 captured Shiites into slavery.

However, Ubaidullah failed to defeat Iranian Shah Tahmasp I (r. 1524–1676), as his five offensives in Khorasan were ultimately unsuccessful. In September 1528, he suffered a defeat in the Battle of Turbet-i-Sheikh Jam, where the Iranians had deployed artillery for the first time. Furthermore, unlike him, his commanders were not interested in permanently occupying Khorasan. The plundering of the country was enough for them. Likewise, the Uzbek Khan Abu Sa'id, who ruled Samarkand between 1530 and 1533, had no interest in strengthening Ubaidullah's domestic power and refused to help him.

Finally, in 1538, Ubaidullah, now Khan himself, moved against the independent Khwarazm, the later Khanate of Khiva, and killed the local Khan Avanish, but was soon driven out by his son Din Muhammed. Shortly after this defeat, he died and was buried in the Mir Arab Madrasa. Power struggles broke out among the Uzbeks, which lasted until 1556.

== Sources ==
- Howorth, Henry Hoyle. History of the Mongols, from the 9th to the 19th Century. Part II division II. The so-called tartars of Russia and Central Asia. London: Longmans, Green and Co, 1880.
- Obayd-Allāh Khan in Encyclopaedia Iranica
- Relations of Ubaidullah Khan with Persia (1510–1539) by Mansura Haider

Ubaidullah Khan Shaybanid
Regnal titles
Preceded by Abu Sa'id ibn Kuchkunchi Muhammad	Khan of Bukhara; 1534–1539	Succeeded by Abdullah I ibn Kuchkunchi Muhammad
