= Ayozbii Madrasah =

Madrasa in Bukhara, Uzbekistan

Ayozbi madrasah
- Ayozbiy madrasasi

General information
- Status: State property.
- Type: Madrasah
- Architectural style: Central Asian architecture
- Location: Bukhara Region, Uzbekistan
- Owner: Ayozbi

Technical details
- Material: baked bricks
- Size: 51 cells

Ayozbi Madrasah is architectural monument built in Bukhara.

== Details ==
The madrasah has not been preserved today. Ayozbi madrasah was built by Ayozbi during the reign of Bukhara emirs Amir Haydar and Amir Nasrullah in Qazi Orda Guzari, Bukhara Emirate. Ayozbi was one of the most influential people in the court of the emir of Bukhara. At first, he was on the side of Umar Khan when Nasrullah Khan came to the top of the state power, and fought against him. Later, he goes to Nasrullah Khan's side. At that time, Ayozbi was in the position of gunner. Nasrullah Khan kept his previous position. He took an active part in the battles fought for the Shahrisabz Bey together with the emir of Bukhara, Nasrullah Khan. After that, he was promoted and given the position of bey. He is appointed as the governor of Samarkand.

The salary of the mudarris who worked in this madrasah was 7–8 gil. According to the sources, at the end of the 19th century, at the beginning of the 20th century, the teachers named Mullah Abdurahim, Mullah Hakim, and Mullah Muhammad Sharif worked in the Ayozbi madrasah. 2 students lived in madrasah rooms. In addition, the documents contain the names of students who studied at the madrasah. Such students as Shakir Vobkandi, Said Kamal Vobkandi, Abdusamad G'izhduvani studied. The Ayozbi madrasah consisted of 51 rooms. This madrasah was built in the style of Central Asian architecture. The madrasah is built of brick, wood, stone and ganch.

== See also ==
- Khoja Nihol Madrasah
