= Amir Muzaffar Madrasa =

Madrasa in Bukhara, Uzbekistan

- Amir Muzaffar madrasasi

General information
- Status: under the protection of the state
- Type: madrasa
- Architectural style: Central Asian architecture
- Location: Bukhara Region, Uzbekistan
- Construction started: 1868 year
- Owner: Amir Muzaffar Khan

Technical details
- Material: brick, wood, stone and ganch
- Size: 9 cells

The Amir Muzaffar Madrasa is a madrasa located in Bukhara. It has not been preserved today. The Amir Muzaffar Madrasa was established in 1868 by Amir Muzaffar Khan, who ruled in Istemurbi Guzar, Bukhara Emirate. The madrasa was small and endowment. Research scientist Abdusattor Jumanazarov studied a number of foundation documents related to this madrasah and provided information related to the madrasa. In the foundation document, it is written about the madrasa: "Hazrat Amir Muzaffar built a 9-room madrasa in the month of Zulqada in the year 1285 Hijri (February–March 1868) in the Lab-i Hauz in Istemurbi guzari." This document is confirmed with the seal of Qazi Abduhamid bin Damulla Baqi. The cream market in Istemurbi guzar and the rag market in Boboyi al guzar were endowed for the foundation of the madrasa. According to the document, the head of the madrasa was appointed as a mutawalli. The Madrasa Mutawalli received a salary from the waqf funds. The remaining funds will be divided into 21 parts. Two students lived in madrasah rooms. The photo of the madrasa is preserved in Olga Sukhareva's book. The madrasa is located next to a pond and has an ornate and gabled gate. The foundation is raised above the ground. There was also a one-story mosque near the madrasa. Its place corresponds to the Istemurbi madrasah, which Sharif Makhdum taught. Amir Muzaffar was the sixth ruler of Bukhara Emirate. Bukhara became a protectorate of the Russian Empire in 1868 during the reign of Amir Muzaffar Khan. Amir Muzaffarkhan madrasah consisted of 9 rooms. This madrasah was built in the style of Central Asian architecture. The madrasa is built of brick, wood, stone and ganch.
