= Amir Olim Khan Madrasah =

Madrasa in Bukhara, Uzbekistan

Amir Olim Khan madrasah
- Amir Olimxon madrasasi
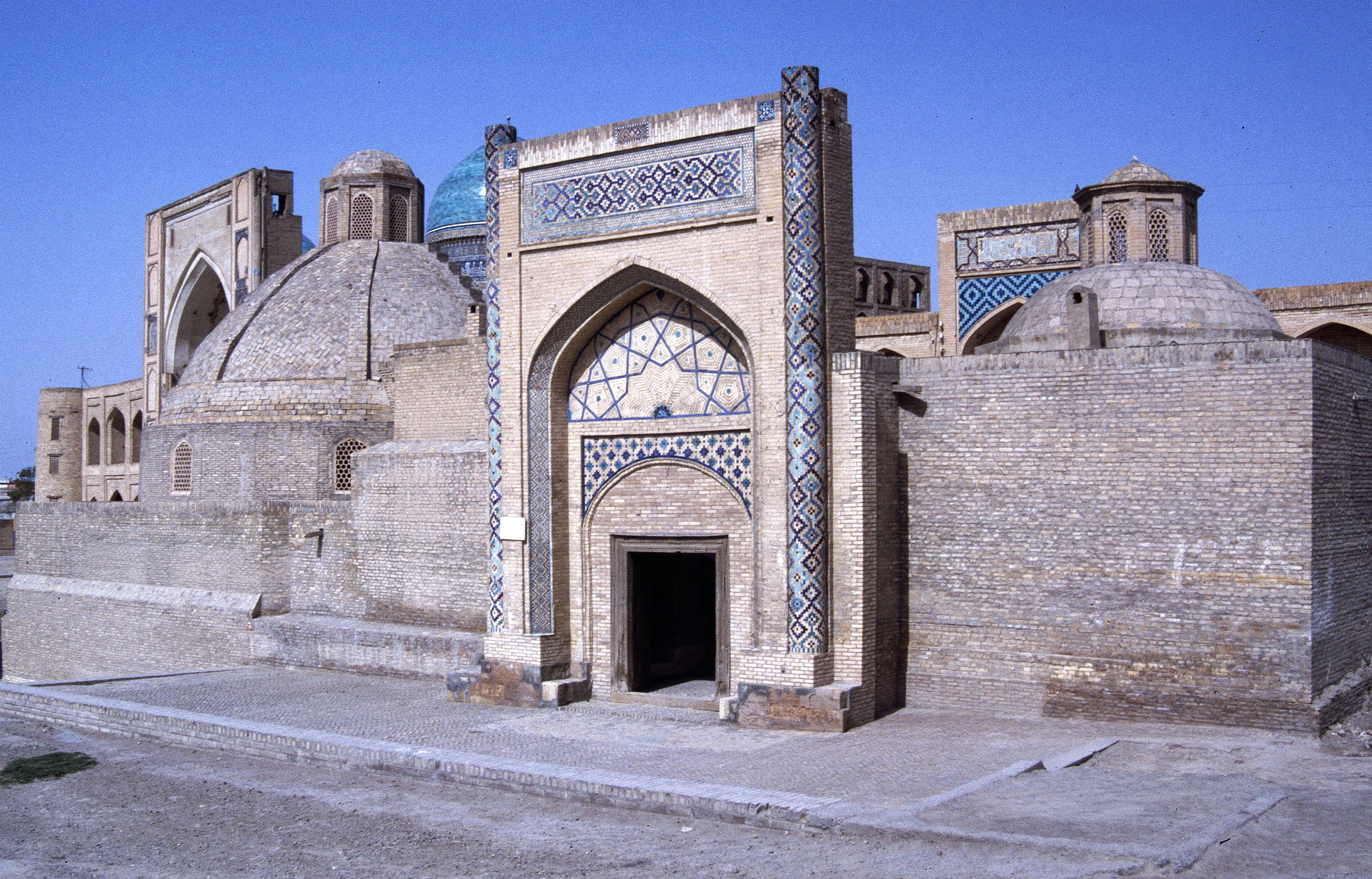
- Interactive map of the Amir Olim Khan madrasah area

General information
- Status: State property
- Type: Madrasah
- Location: Bukhara Region, Uzbekistan
- Coordinates: 39.7755°N 64.4156°E
- Construction started: 1914
- Construction stopped: 1915
- Owner: Amir Olim Khan

Technical details
- Material: baked bricks

Amir Olim Khan madrasah is a madrasah founded in 1915 by the Mangite ruler Sayyid Mir Muhammad Alim Khan in Bukhara, Uzbekistan, then the capital of the Bukhara Emirate.

== History ==
The madrasah was built in 1914–1915 at the expense of Sayyid Mir Muhammad Alim Khan, the last ruler of the Bukhara Emirate, on the site of the Qazi Kalon bathhouse, where the octagonal dome building has been preserved.

The Madrasah is located on the south side of the Po-i-Kalyan ensemble square, next to the Mir Arab Madrasah.

After the establishment of Soviet power in Bukhara, the madrasa was closed. Since the beginning of 1924, the monument served as a city library. Later, during the Uzbek SSR, the madrasa was turned into a children's library named after Pavlik Morozov.

Now it is included in the "National list of immovable property objects of tangible cultural heritage" of Uzbekistan. It is still functioning as a library.

In 2011, renovation works were carried out in the madrasah.

== Education ==
Imam Sobirjon Mustafi, in his article entitled "Regarding the establishment of a madrasah in Bukhara", published in "Vaqt" newspaper, reported that Kholmurod Efendi from Tashkent was appointed as the headmaster of the madrasah, and the headmaster, Sadriddin Makhdum, received lessons in math, calligraphy, fariz, and Ibodulla Makhdum fatwa. In the madrasah, it is prescribed to teach tafsir, hadith, kalam, fiqh, methodical fiqh, accounting, tajweed, and history. The charter of the madrasah prohibits a student studying in this educational institution from studying in a second madrasah, and the examination of students at the end of each year is strictly defined. When the madrasah was established, it was allowed to educate only Bukharians, and later students from abroad were also accepted. In a letter from Bukhara to "Vaqt" magazine, it was noted that in the 1915–1916 academic year Ishak Sayfiddin from Tatarstan was accepted to study at the madrasah.

== Literatures ==
- Бабаджанова, Г. И. (1988). Маньковская, Лия Юльевна (ed.). По древним городам Узбекистана: Ташкент, Самарканд, Шахрисабз, Бухара, Хива [In the ancient cities of Uzbekistan: Tashkent, Samarkand, Shakhrisabz, Bukhara, Khiva] (in Russian). Колбинцева А. П., Маньковская Л. Ю. Мoscow: Profizdat.
- Юсупова, М. А (1997). Эволюция зодчества Бухары XV—начала XVII века [The evolution of architecture in Bukhara from the 15th to early 17th centuries]. Общественные науки в Узбекистане [Social sciences in Uzbekistan] (in Russian) (9—10—11).
