= Kuchkunji Khan =

Supreme Khan in the Bukhara Khanate from 1512–1530

Kuchkunji Khan (Chagatay: کوچکونچی خان; 1452–1531) - a descendant of the Timurid Mirzo Ulugbek, the third representative of the Uzbek dynasty of Shaybanids, who ruled in the Bukhara Khanate in 1512–1531.

After the death of Muhammad Shaybani Khan, his uncle, son of Abu'l-Khayr Khan and a descendant of Mirzo Ulugbek, Suyunchkhodja Khan (1511–1512), was elected the Supreme Khan of the dynasty for a short time.

At the end of 1512, all the Shaybanid sultans gathered in Samarkand and, with the consent of Ubaydullah Sultan, Governor of Buchara, pronounced the elder brother of Sunchkhoja Khan, Kuchkunji Sultan, to be the ruler. After that, Suyunchhoja Khan renounced the title of Supreme Khan and, as seniority, transferred it to his older brother. Kuchkunji Khan (1512–1530) became the Supreme Khan of the Bukharan khanate.

In 1513–1523, Kuchkunji Khan carried out a monetary reform, which, unlike Shaybani Khan's monetary reform, was less thoughtful and took about 10 years. However, it contributed to the growth of the economy and trade. The title of Kuchkunji Khan "Sultan Khakan Abu Mansur Bahadurkhan", as well as the names of the first four caliphs, were placed on the coins.

He was succeeded by his eldest son Abu Sa'id.

== Sources ==
- Robert D. McChesney. Central Asia VI. In the 16th-18th Centuries / Encyclopædia Iranica — Vol. V, Fasc. 2, pp. 176−193
- Robert D. McChesney, Waqf in Central Asia: Four Hundred Years in the History of a Muslim Shrine, 1480–1889. Princeton University Press, 1991

Regnal titles
Preceded by Muhammad Shaybani	Khan of Bukhara; 1512–1531	Succeeded by Abu Sa'id bin Kochkunju
