= Ulugʻbek =

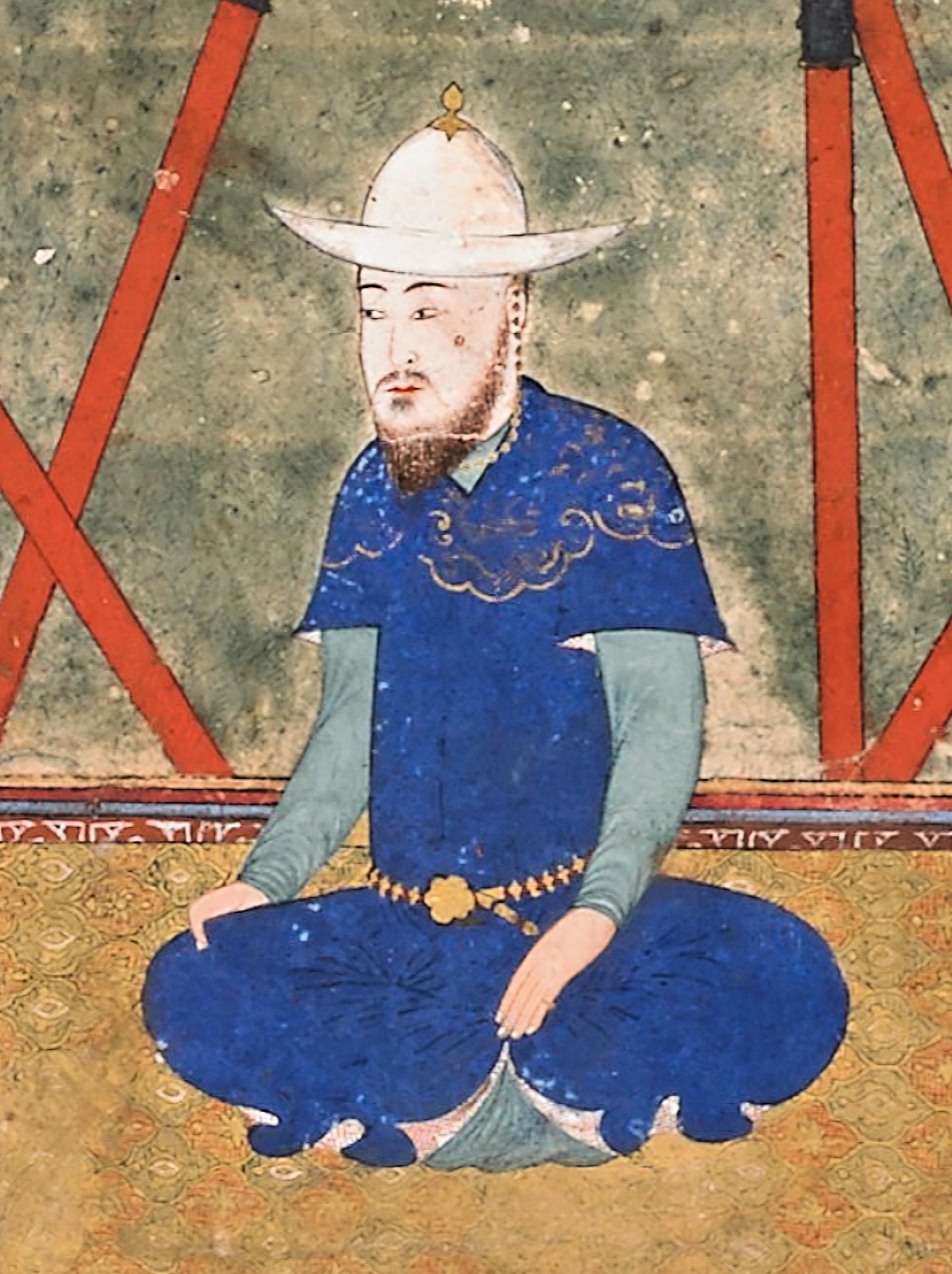
- Ulugh Beg in a contemporary Timurid painting (1425–1450)
- Gender: Masculine

Origin
- Language: Turkic
- Meaning: great leader, powerful leader
- Region of origin: Turkic world, Central Asia

Ulugʻbek or Ulugbek is an Uzbek masculine given name. The name Ulugbek consists of two parts: "Ulug" - great, and "bek" - a title denoting a ruler or tribal leader in Turkic languages, meaning a great ruler, a powerful leader. Notable people with the name include:

== Ulugbek ==
- Ulugbek Alimov (born 1989), Uzbek weightlifter
- Ulugbek Asanbaev (born 1979), Kazakh footballer
- Ulugbek Bakayev (born 1978), Uzbek footballer
- Ulugbek Ibragimov (born 1975), Uzbek boxer
- Ulugbek Khoshimov (born 2001), Uzbek footballer
- Ulugbek Rashitov (born 2002), Uzbek taekwondo practitioner
- Ulugbek Ruzimov (1968–2017), Uzbek footballer
- Ulugbek Yuldashev (born 1985), Kyrgyz businessman

== Ulugʻbek ==
- Xojiakbar Ulugʻbek oʻgʻli Alijonov (born 1997), Uzbek footballer
- Ulugʻbek Qodirov (born 1983), Uzbek actor

== See also ==
- Ulugh Beg
- Ulugbek (town)
- Ulugbek Madrasah (Bukhara)
- Ulugbek Madrasah (Gijduvan)
- Mirzo Ulugbek, district in Tashkent
- Mirzo Ulugbek (Tashkent Metro station)
