= Po-i-Kalyan =

Islamic religious complex in Bukhara, Uzbekistan

Po-i-Kalan
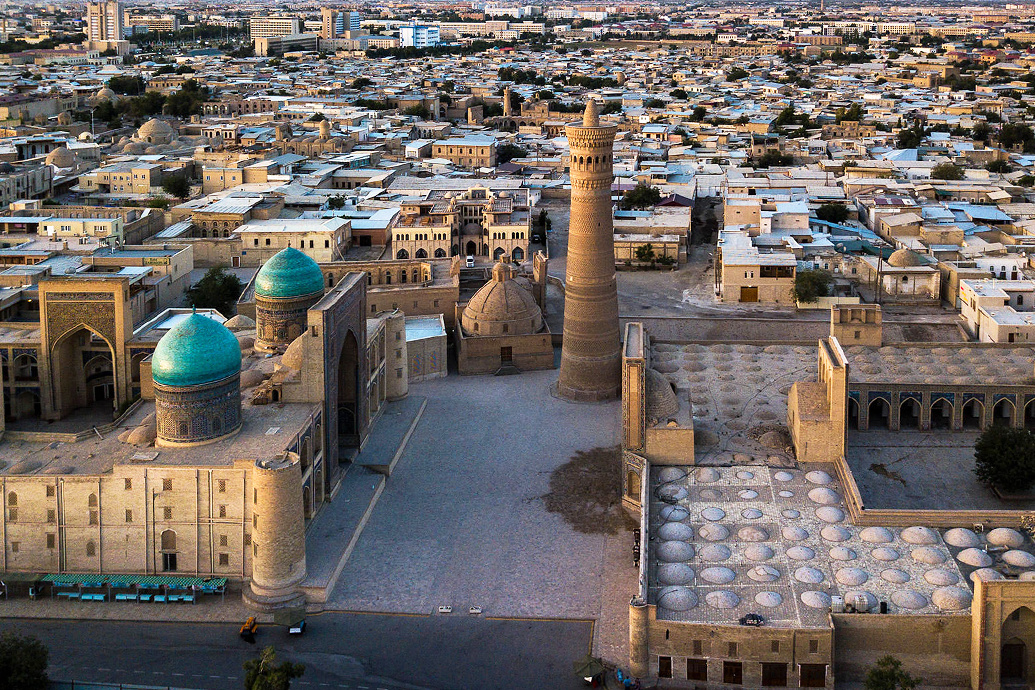
- Courtyard at Po-i-Kalyan, with the madrasa and minaret

- Location within Uzbekistan

Religion
- Affiliation: Sunni Islam
- District: Bukhara
- Province: Bukhara
- Ecclesiastical or organisational status: Mosque complex

Location
- Location: Bukhara, Uzbekistan
- Country: Uzbekistan
- Coordinates: 39°46′33″N 64°24′51″E

Architecture
- Type: Mosque, madrasa, courtyards, minaret
- Style: Islamic
- Completed: 12th-century, 16th-century

Specifications
- Minaret: 1
- Minaret height: 45.6 m

Po-i-Kalan, or Poi Kalan (Uzbek: Poi Kalon; Tajik: Пои калон; Persian: پای کلان, romanized: Pā-i Kalān, lit. 'At the Foot of the Great One'), is an Islamic religious complex located in Bukhara, Uzbekistan. The complex consists of three parts, the Kalan Mosque (Masjid-i Kalan), the Kalan Minaret (Minâra-i Kalân) to which the name refers, and the Mir-i-Arab Madrasah.

The positioning of the three structures creates a square courtyard in its center, with the Mir-i-Arab and the Kalan Mosque standing on opposite ends. In addition, the square is enclosed by a bazaar and a set of baths connected to the Minaret on the northern and southern ends respectively.

The congregational mosque in the complex is one of the largest mosques in Central Asia, behind the Bibi Khanum Mosque in Samarkand, Uzbekistan, and the Great Mosque of Herat, Afghanistan.

== Construction history ==
Both the Kalan Mosque and Minaret were initially commissioned by Arslan Khan in 1121, with the famed Kalan Minaret concluding construction in 1127. However, Genghis Khan destroyed the original Friday Mosque in 1220, leaving only the Kalan Minaret untouched. The Kalan Mosque and Mir-i Arab Madrasah of the current day were commissioned in 1515 and 1535 respectively by Shibani Kahn's nephew Ubaydullah Khan after he and his father Mahmud Sultan gained authority over Bukhara. The Friday Mosque itself bears similarities to the Bibi Khanum mosque in Samarkand, and the layout of the complex conjoining the Mosque and the Madrasah creates a "kosh", a unique square layout employed in 16th century Central Asian architecture defined by the spacing between both a mosque and a madrasah. The "kosh" created by the geometric spacing between mosque and madrasah augments the ornate façade of the Kalan Mosque and the magnitude of the opposing madrasah to imbue the individuals with a sense of majesty that reflected Ubaydullah's power.

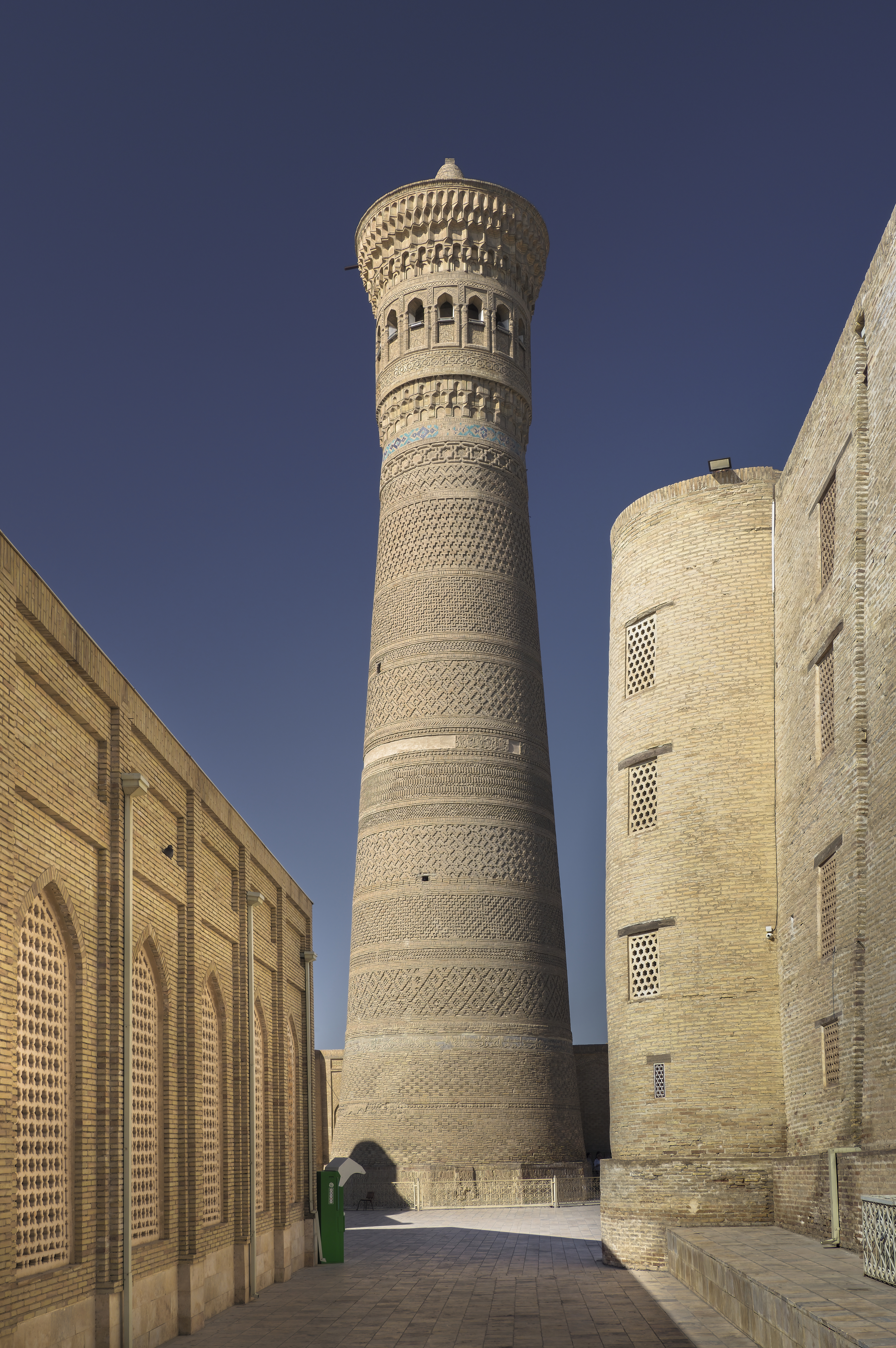
Brick Kalan Minaret (2025)

== Historical background ==
The place, where the complex Po-i-Kalan is located, is the site of a few completely ruined buildings from the past. In pre-Islamic era, a central cathedral for Zoroastrians occupied part of site. After 713, south of the Ark, several edifices of main cathedral mosque were built, razed, and restored after the destruction from fires and wars. Additionally, the reconstructed buildings were shifted from place to place in the area. In 1127, the Karakhanid ruler Arslan-khan completed construction on the cathedral mosque with the minaret. The greatness of the structures so amazed Genghis Khan, he mistakenly believed the mosque to be a khan's palace. Nevertheless, the mosque was not spared destruction by fire, and for many years after the conflagration, it lay in ruins. All that remained intact of the original mosque complex was the minaret Kalan (Minara-yi-Kalan).

After the death of Shaibani-khan in 1510, most local rulers (emirs and sultans) only partially recognized the central government. The capital of the Shaibanid state was in Samarkand. In 1512 the nephew of Shaibani-khan, the young prince Muizz ad-Din Abu-l Gazi Ubaidullah, became sultan of Bukhara. He inherited the power from his father Mahmud-sultan, who was the cadet brother of Shaibani-khan and his faithful companion-in-arms. Until 1533, Ubaidullah-sultan was a successful governor of Bukhara, when he was enthroned as a khan of the entire Shaibanid state, i.e. Khan of Maverannahr (Ma wara'u'n-nahr). In spite of this, he refused to move his residence to Samarkand, the state capital. Later, he made Bukhara the capital of the Shaibanid state. Afterwards, the state governed by Ubaidullah (Ubaidulla) received a new name, the Bukhara Khanate. Thus Ubaidullah-khan (gov. 1533–1539) became the first khan of the Bukhara Khanate. While Ubaidullah-khan was the khan of Maverannahr, his son Abdul-Aziz-khan was the khan of Bukhara. They considered Bukhara to be their family lot. They were patriots of Bukhara and cared for success of the city.

That the governor of Bukhara in 1514 built a grand mosque that rivaled the Bibi-Khanym Mosque, the symbol of royal Samarkand, shows the shifting of the capital of the Shaibanid state to Bukhara. With the construction of the Kalan Mosque, Ubaidullah-sultan started remaking the city into a new capital city, rather than fighting for domination over Samarkand, which was always hostile to the Shaibanids.

== Ensemble components ==
=== Kalan minaret ===
==== History ====
The Kalan Minaret (formally the Minâra-i Kalân or "Grand Minaret") was originally built alongside the foundation of the Kalan Mosque. It has largely persisted through time, acting as the predominant visual landmark of the city of Bukhara as a whole. The minaret itself is constructed entirely out of baked bricks. It is a cylindrical structure with a wide base narrowing upwards towards its upper lantern, and has a height of about forty six meters and a diameter at the base of about nine meters. Legend dictates that during construction, the master builder, Bako, finished building only the base of the structure before taking a three-year hiatus to allow the foundation to solidify. After this three-year period he then completed the minaret, with the solid foundation laid out allowing the minaret to achieve such grand stature.

==== Design ====
The monumental size of the Kalan Minaret is visually elaborated by intricate decoration consisting primarily of brickwork techniques. Parallel bands of unique brick sculpting cover the exterior of the minaret without a single repetition, and the lantern itself supports a sixteen arched rotunda. Additionally, a set of terra cotta stalactites surround the base of the lantern, serving as the visual transition from the narrow cylindrical shaft of the minaret to the expanded base of the lantern. These stalactites further contain two vegetal motifs mirroring the motifs developed in Sassanid art in Iran: one is a vegetal twig inscribed in an arch and the other is a trefoil inscribed within a triangle. Finally, a turquoise band of tiled inscriptions lies directly underneath the three-layered stalactite decorations supporting the base of the lantern. Overall, the decorative aspects of the Kalan Minaret were primarily resultants of brickwork, fully displaying the versatile capability of the material despite its simple construction.

=== Kalan Mosque ===
The Kalan Mosque (Masjid-i Kalan) was completed in 1515 in the Khanate of Bukhara emulating the model of the mosque built in the time of Arslan Khan with the addition of a large blue dome atop the mihrab. The architectural style of the mosque also draws inspiration and clear analogs to the Bibi Khanum Mosque in Samarkand. The mosque itself is 130 x 81 meters and the impressive 30 meter height of the blue dome makes the structure particularly imposing. Four iwans lie on the axes of the courtyard with an even larger arched iwan denoting the east-facade of the main structure. As the structure extends inwards from the main building, the shape transitions from a square base into an octagon and eventually a cylindrical structure as one extends further into the area of the mihrab standing opposite of the east-facade. The interior of the structure consists of a hypostyle layout which meets the internal courtyard through two hundred and eighty eight domes lining the inner courtyard. The Kalan Mosque is an entirely inwards facing build with its lack of exterior windows juxtaposed against the open courtyard in the center of the structure.

Several kinds of decorative designs line the massive exterior of the Kalan Mosque. Upon reconstruction in 1515, the exterior walls were decorated with majolica and other ornamental tiles. The mihrab, iwans, and the walls of the mosque are all decorated primarily with traditional artwork correspondent to the late Timurid period including blue and white tile mosaics, vegetal motifs, and banna'i brickwork lining the building.

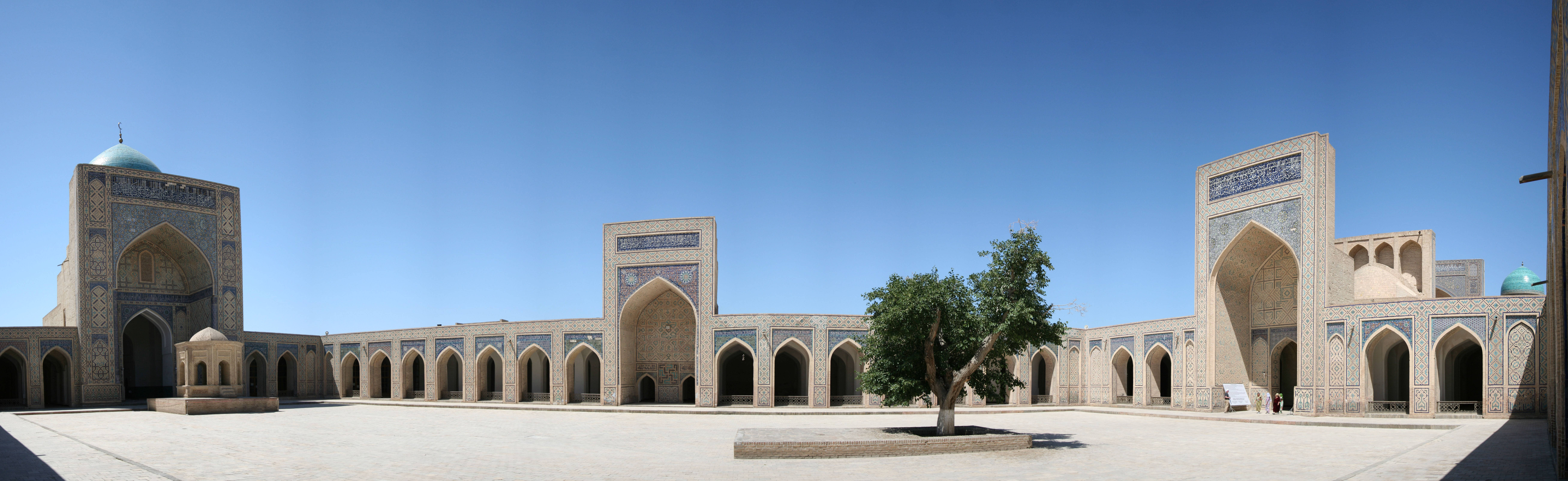
Inner courtyard of the Kalyan Mosque, part of the Po-i-Kalyan Complex in Bukhara, Uzbekistan, decorated with banna'i brickwork

=== Mir-i Arab Madrassah ===
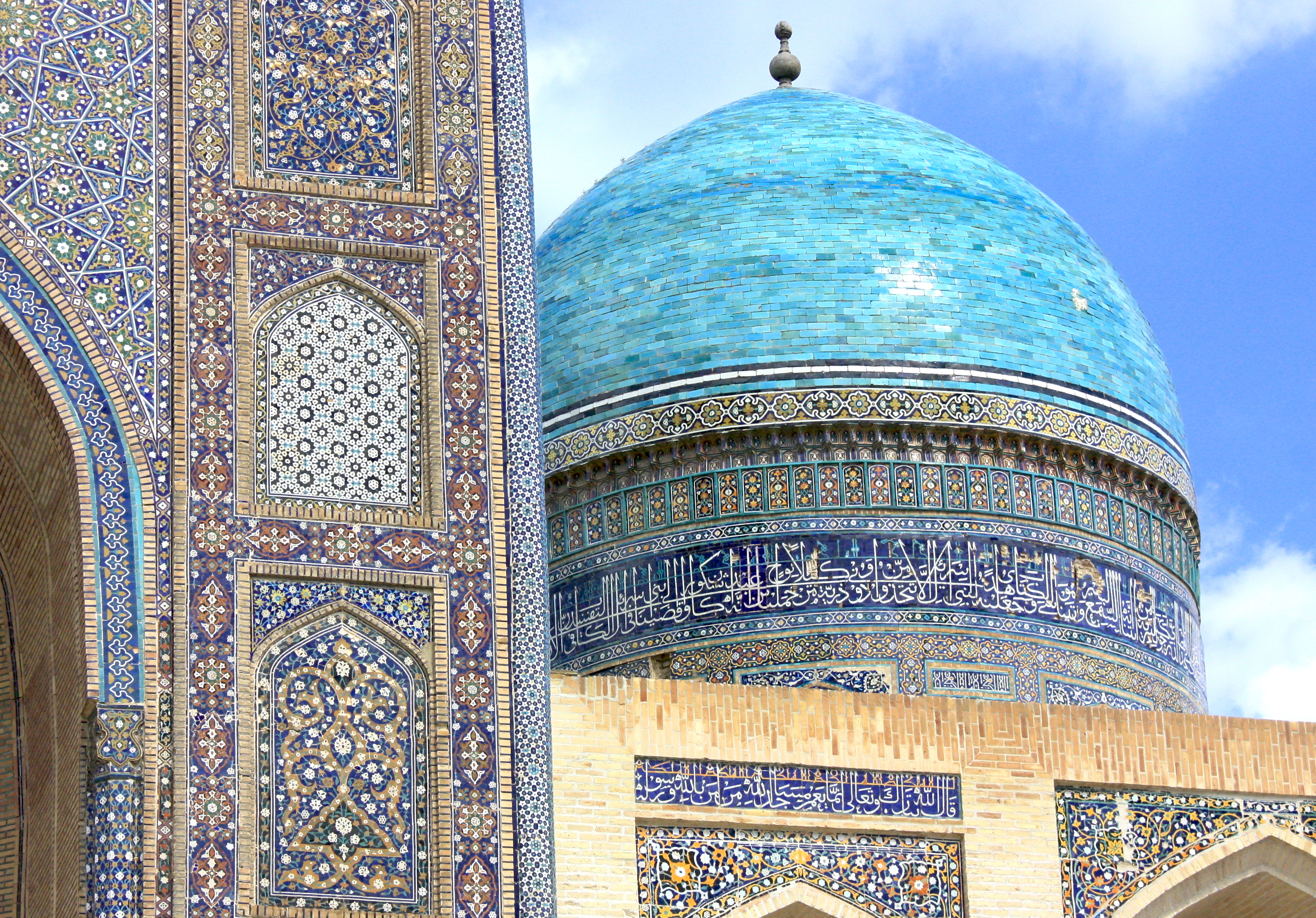
A view of intricate tile-work on the Mir-i-Arab Madrasa in Bukhara, Uzbekistan

==== History ====
The construction of Mir-i-Arab Madrasah (lit. 'Prince of the Arabs Madrasa') is credited to Sheikh Abdullah Yamani of Yemen in 1535. Also known as Mir-i-Arab, he was considered the spiritual mentor of Ubaydullah Khan and his son Abdul-Aziz-khan. Prior to the construction of the madrasah, Ubaydullah-khan was waging war against Iran. He managed to seize control of Herat several times, resulting in the capture of a great many captives. Eventually, Ubaydullah-khan sold three thousand of these Persian captives in order to provide the funding for the construction of the Mir-i-Arab Madrasah.

The interior of the Mir-i-Arab serves as evidence of some of the burial traditions of the time period. By the 1630s, sovereigns no longer erected splendid mausoleums for themselves and for their relatives. Khans of Shaibanid dynasty were standard-bearers of Koran traditions and religion became so consequential that even a famed Khan in Ubaydullah was buried next to his mentor in his madrasah. As such, the wooden tomb of Ubaydullah-khan is situated in the middle of the vault (gurhana) in the Mir-i-Arab Madrasah.

==== Design ====
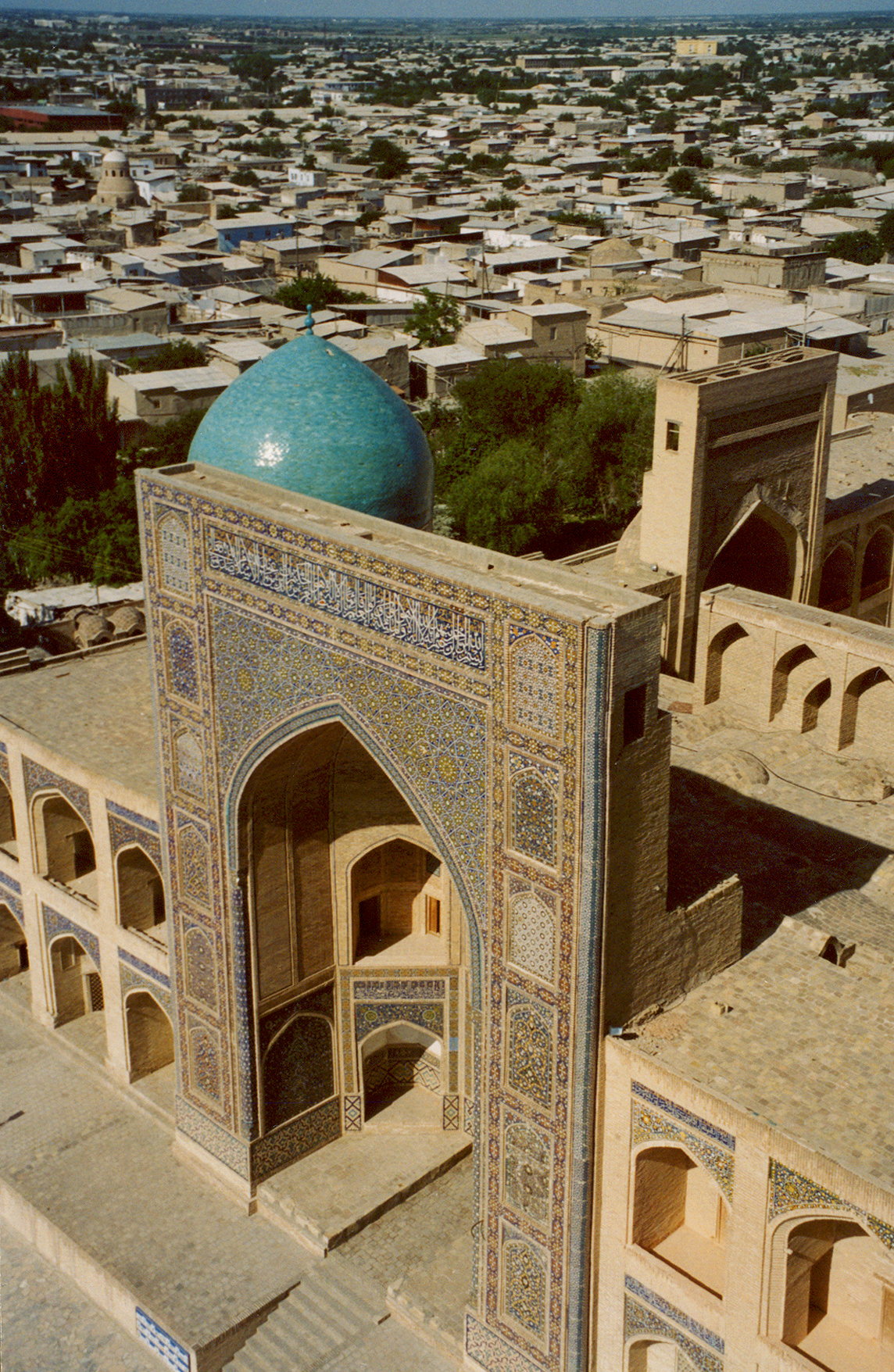
Iwan of the Mir-i Arab madrasa

In terms of design, the Mir-i-Arab has a rectangular courtyard with four inwards facing iwans, each one situated uniquely at the center-point of one of the rectangular edges. The exterior of the Mir-i-Arab spans 73 x 55 meters while the internal courtyard has dimensions of 37 x 33 meters. The interior of the structure also holds its own mosque and mausoleum in addition to the lecture halls that the four iwans function as. One particularly notable element of the madrasah structure is its ornate two-story facade covered by glazed mosaic banna'i tiles inspired again by late Timurid artwork. This facade directly faces the Kalan Mosque and is further flanked on either side by blue domes, adding to the aggrandizing effect of the Poi Kalan ensemble.

==== Current uses ====
In addition to its contribution to the architectural majesty of the Poi Kalan ensemble as a whole, the Mir-i-Arab Madrasah has continued to serve its original function up until the modern day, making it the only madrasah in Central Asia with such a longstanding use. Given the size of the Mir-i-Arab Madrasah and its continued use as a functioning madrasah over the years, other obsolete madrasah in Bukhara were eventually repurposed into makeshift shopping centers. This left only the Mir-i-Arab as the sole functioning madrasah in Bukhara. Moreover, the significance of the traditional use of the structure was reinforced during the time of the Soviet Union, when the madrasah was one of only three centers that the Soviet Party allowed to continue operations. This effectively made the Mir-i-Arab one of the few primary avenues for the Soviet Union's philosophical interaction with the Muslim world.

== See also ==
- Lyab-i Khauz – historic pond (hauz).
- Samanid mausoleum – 9th–10th century architecture.
- List of mosques in Uzbekistan
- Madrasas in Uzbekistan
