= Kalyan Minaret =

Minaret in Bukhara, Uzbekistan

- Минораи Калон, Minorai Kalon (Uzbek) مناره کلان (Persian)
- Minâra-i Kalân, Kalon Minor, Poi-Kalyan Minaret
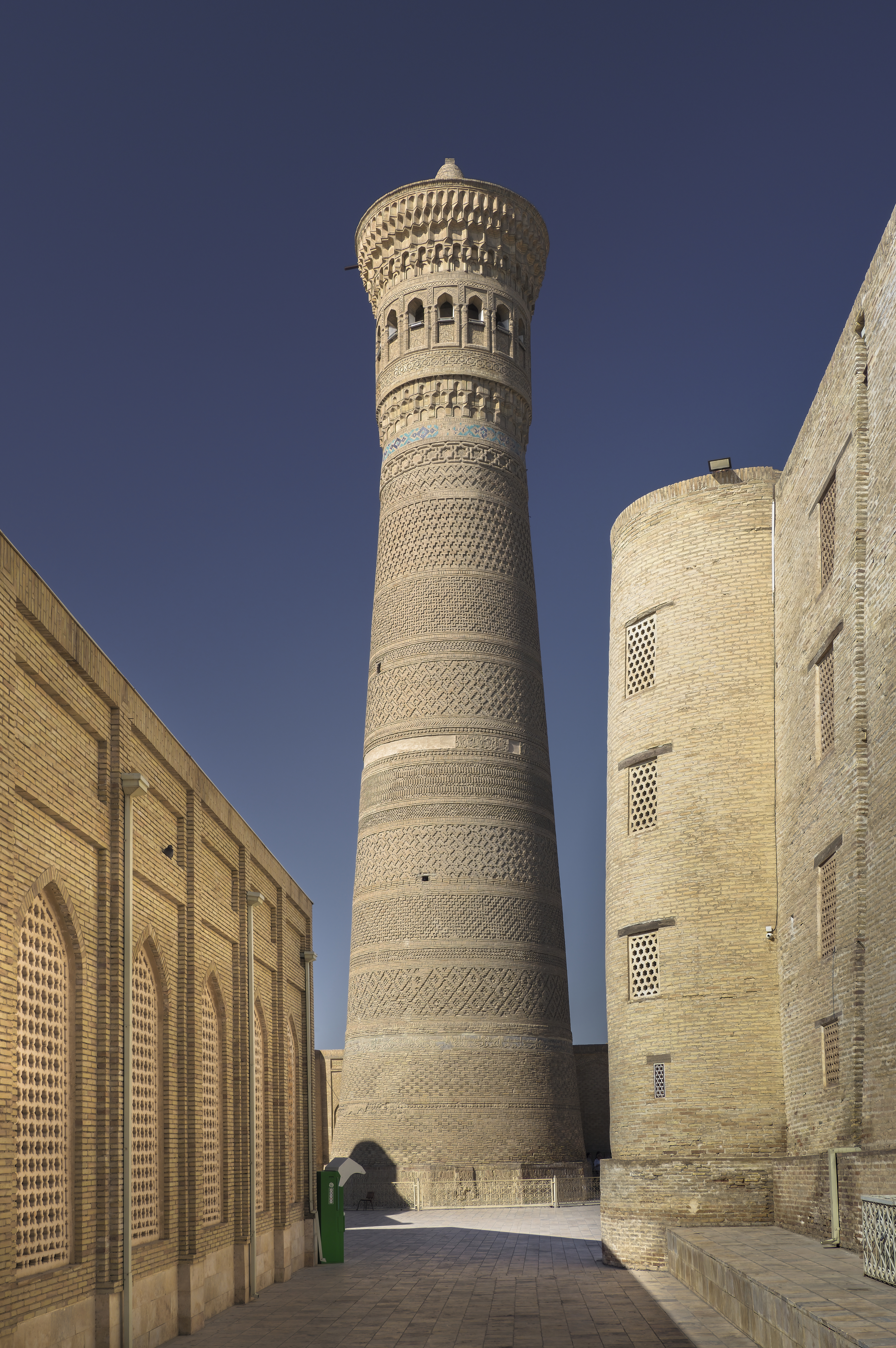
- The Kalyan Minaret in 2025

- Location within Uzbekistan
- 39°46′33″N 64°24′51″E
- Type: Monument, Minaret
- Periods: Western Karakhanid dynasty
- Cultures: Islamic
- Location: Bukhara, Uzbekistan
- Region: Bukhara Region
- Part of: Po-i-Kalyan mosque complex

History
- Built: 1127 AD
- Built by: Arslan Khan Muhammad, Kara-Khanid Khanate

Site notes
- Material: Bricks
- Height: 45.6 m (150 ft), Tip 48 m
- Width: Diameter 9 m bottom, 6 m top

UNESCO World Heritage Site
- Official name: Historic Centre of Bukhara
- Type: Cultural
- Criteria: (ii)(iv)(vi)
- Designated: 1993 (29th session)
- Reference no.: 602
- Bukhara region: List of World Heritage Sites in Northern and Central Asia

The Kalyan Minaret (Uzbek: Минораи Калон, Minorai Kalon, Persian/Tajik: Minâra-i Kalân, Kalon Minor, Kalon Minaret) is a minaret of the Po-i-Kalyan mosque complex in Bukhara, Uzbekistan and one of the most prominent landmarks in the city.

The minaret, designed by Bako, was built on an earlier existing structure called Kalyan by the Qarakhanid ruler Mohammad Arslan Khan in 1127 to summon Muslims to prayer five times a day.

An earlier tower was collapsed before starting this structure which was called Kalyan, meaning welfare, indicating a Buddhist or zoroasterian past. It is made in the form of a circular-pillar baked brick tower, narrowing upwards. It is 45.6 metres (150 feet) high (48 metres including the point), of 9 metres (30 feet) diameter at the bottom and 6 metres (20 feet) overhead.

There is a brick spiral staircase that twists up inside around the pillar to the rotunda. The tower base has narrow ornamental strings belted across it made of bricks which are placed in both straight or diagonal fashion. The frieze is covered with a blue glaze with inscriptions.

In times of war, warriors used the minaret as a watchtower to lookout for enemies.

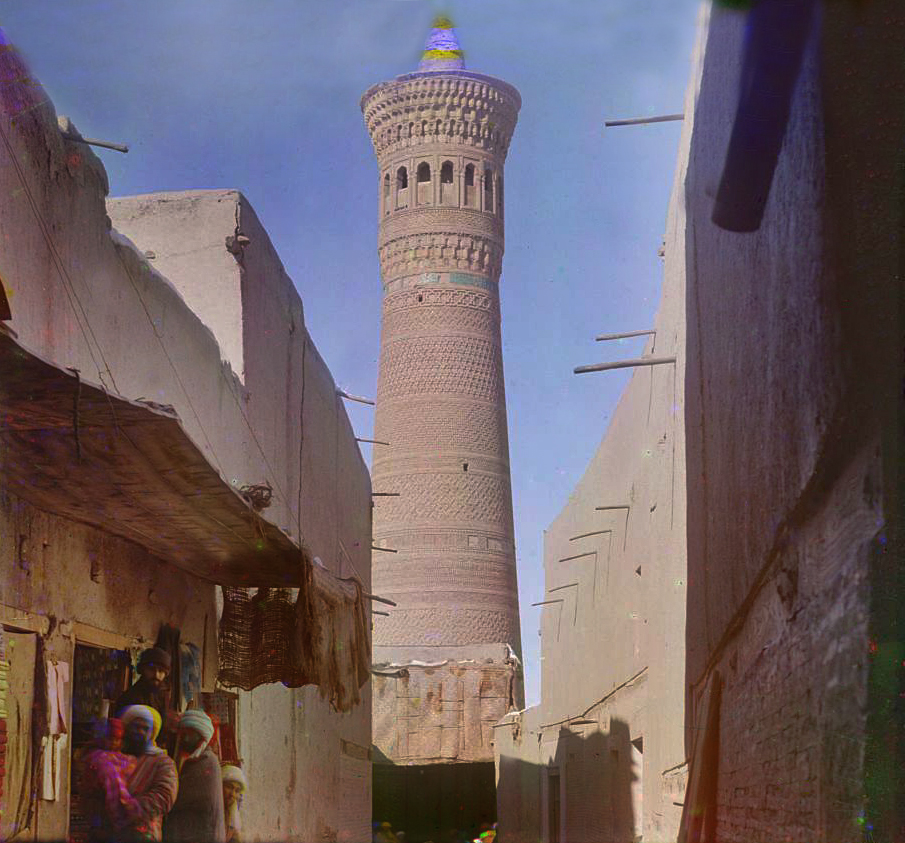
The minaret in 1909

About a hundred years after its construction, the tower so impressed Genghis Khan that he ordered it to be spared when all around was destroyed by his men. It is also known as the Tower of Death, because until as recently as the early twentieth century criminals were executed by being thrown from the top. Fitzroy Maclean, who made a surreptitious visit to the city in 1938, says in his memoir Eastern Approaches, "For centuries before 1870, and again in the troubled years between 1917 and 1920, men were cast down to their death from the delicately ornamented gallery which crowns it."

== History ==
According to some historical sources, before the construction of the Kalyan Minaret in its place was another minaret, a smaller one, which later fell, and in its place it was decided to build the current one.

The minaret was built in 1127 (XII century), when Bukhara was part of the Karakhanid state. The initiator of the construction was the ruler from the Karakhanid dynasty - Arslan Khan Muhammad, who was known for his urban development. His name as the initiator of the construction is carved on one of the belts of the minaret. The architect of the minaret was the master of Bako, who was later buried 45 meters from the minaret itself. In the will of the architect it was said that the minaret, if it falls, fell on his head, and bequeathed him to bury it in the place indicated by him. According to legend, the master builder, who laid the foundation of the minaret from alabaster and camel milk, disappeared, but returned only two years later, when the foundation became durable, and proceeded to the brickwork.

At one time, the minaret performed several functions. It was simultaneously an observation tower, also had a religious function, in particular, it was used for adhan (calling Muslims for prayer) to the Kalyan Mosque, which is located next to the minaret. It was also used to call the population in the nearest area to read decrees of rulers and other occasions.

In 1920, the minaret suffered damage by Soviet bombardment in the Bukhara operation.

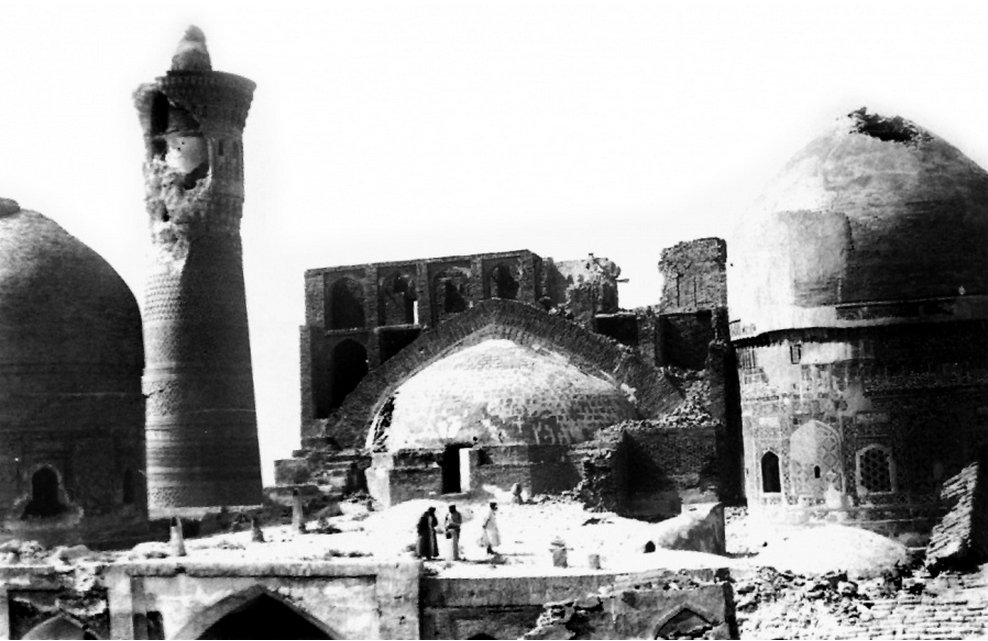
Damage during the Bukhara operation

In 1924, a small part of the wall and the minaret's muqarnases were restored. In 1960, by the founding by Ochil Bobomurodov, the underground part of the minaret was repaired and reinforced, where the foundation and the foundation of the minaret are located. In 1997, to the 2500th anniversary of Bukhara, the minaret was thoroughly reconstructed and restored by the best masters. In subsequent years, the minaret also carried out small restoration works.

== Description ==
The Kalon Minaret is a powerful, tapering brick pillar that culminates in a cylindrical lantern rotunda with a stalactite crown. The lantern has sixteen open arches, above which there is also an ornamental stalactite cornice called "sharafa." The minaret is located at the southeastern corner of the Friday Mosque and is connected to its roof by an arched footbridge.

The height of the minaret's shaft is 46.5 meters. The circumference of the shaft at the base is 30.43 meters, and the corresponding diameter is 9.7 meters. In Central Asia, only the minaret of Kutlug-Timur in Kunya Urgench has a larger base diameter. The Bokhara minaret's shaft noticeably narrows towards the top, and just below the lantern, at around 32 meters from the base, its diameter is 6 meters.The minaret's round shaft is supported by a ten-sided pedestal, over 185 centimeters in height, constructed, like the entire minaret, from high-quality fired bricks (27x27x5 centimeters) with gypsum mortar. Over time, the bricks and mortar fused into a monolithic mass, ensuring the rare preservation of the structure in this region.

The underground part of the minaret consists of a brick foundation of unknown depth. The excavation, reaching a depth of 13 meters, did not reach its base. The lower parts of the foundation are laid on a clayey (loess) mortar, with gypsum and vegetable ash gradually added as it rises, reducing the clay content. Consequently, there is no loess mortar in the minaret's pedestal. The perfectly regular masonry of the foundation is adorned with three belts of yellow limestone slabs. The decorative embellishments of the minaret consist of bricks and tiles that are very well-fired without glaze. The minaret's walls are adorned with various, not just geometric, patterns. Additionally, historical and religious Kufic texts are inscribed on the walls.

== Gallery ==
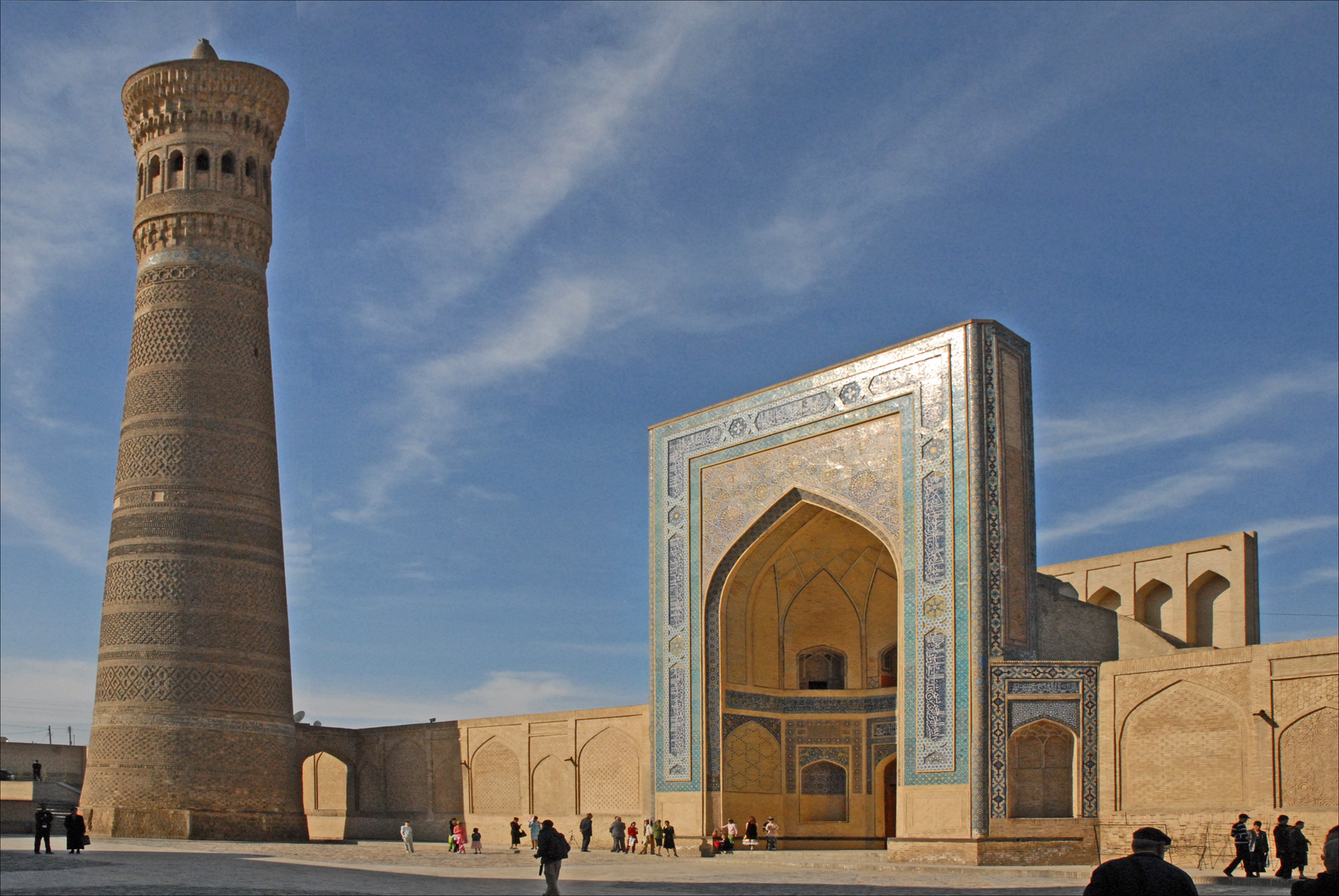
Part of the Poi-Kalyan ensemble: the minaret and the mosque Kalyan

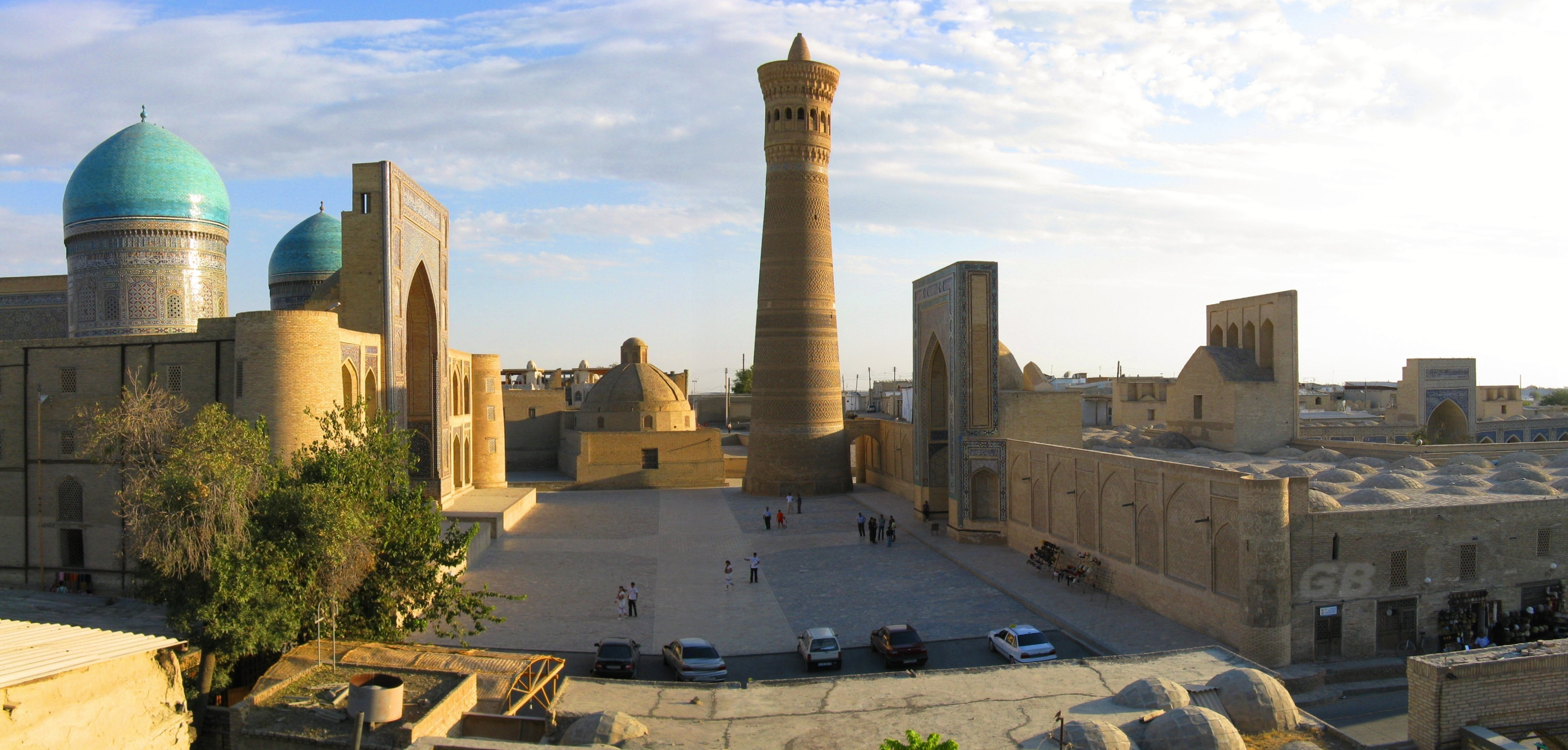
View on the Poi-Kalyan: minaret and Kalyan mosque, medrese Miri-Arab

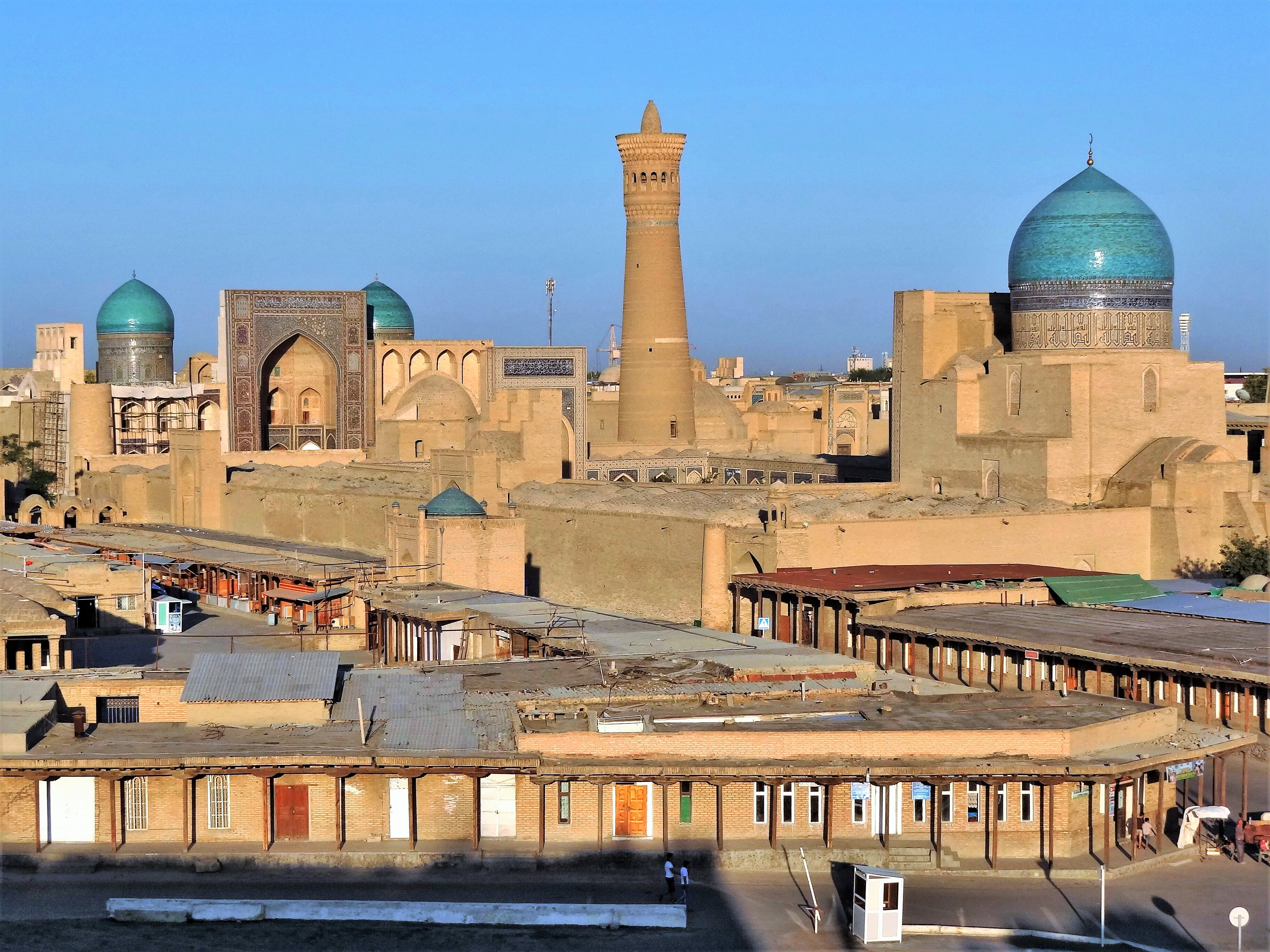
View of part of old Bukhara

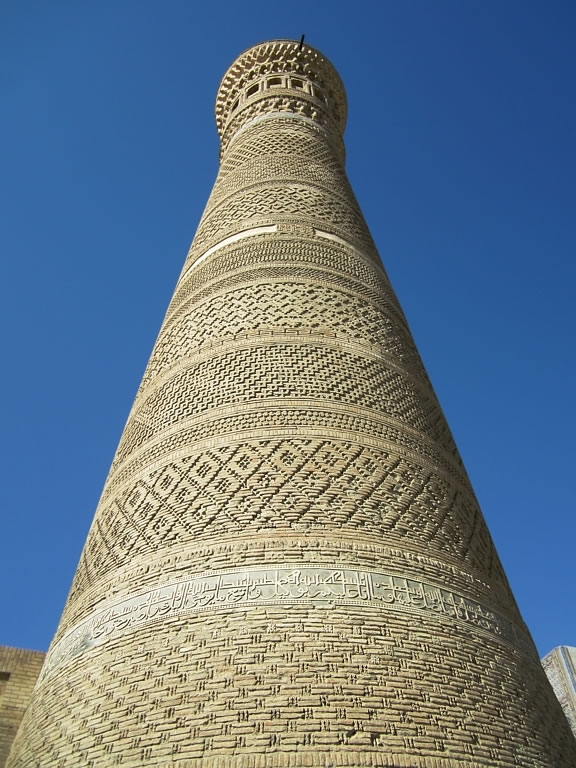
Exterior walls of the minaret

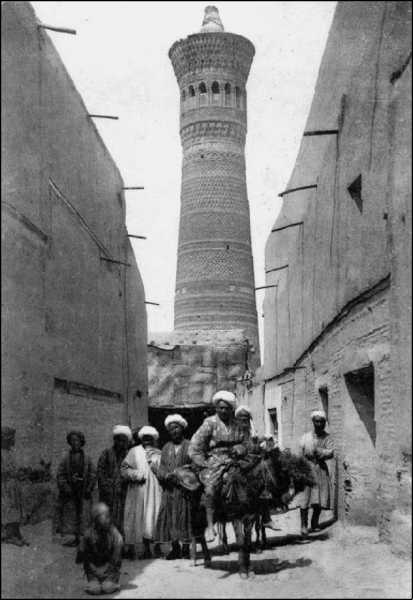
Kalyan Minaret in 1913; photo by Wilhelm Harteveld

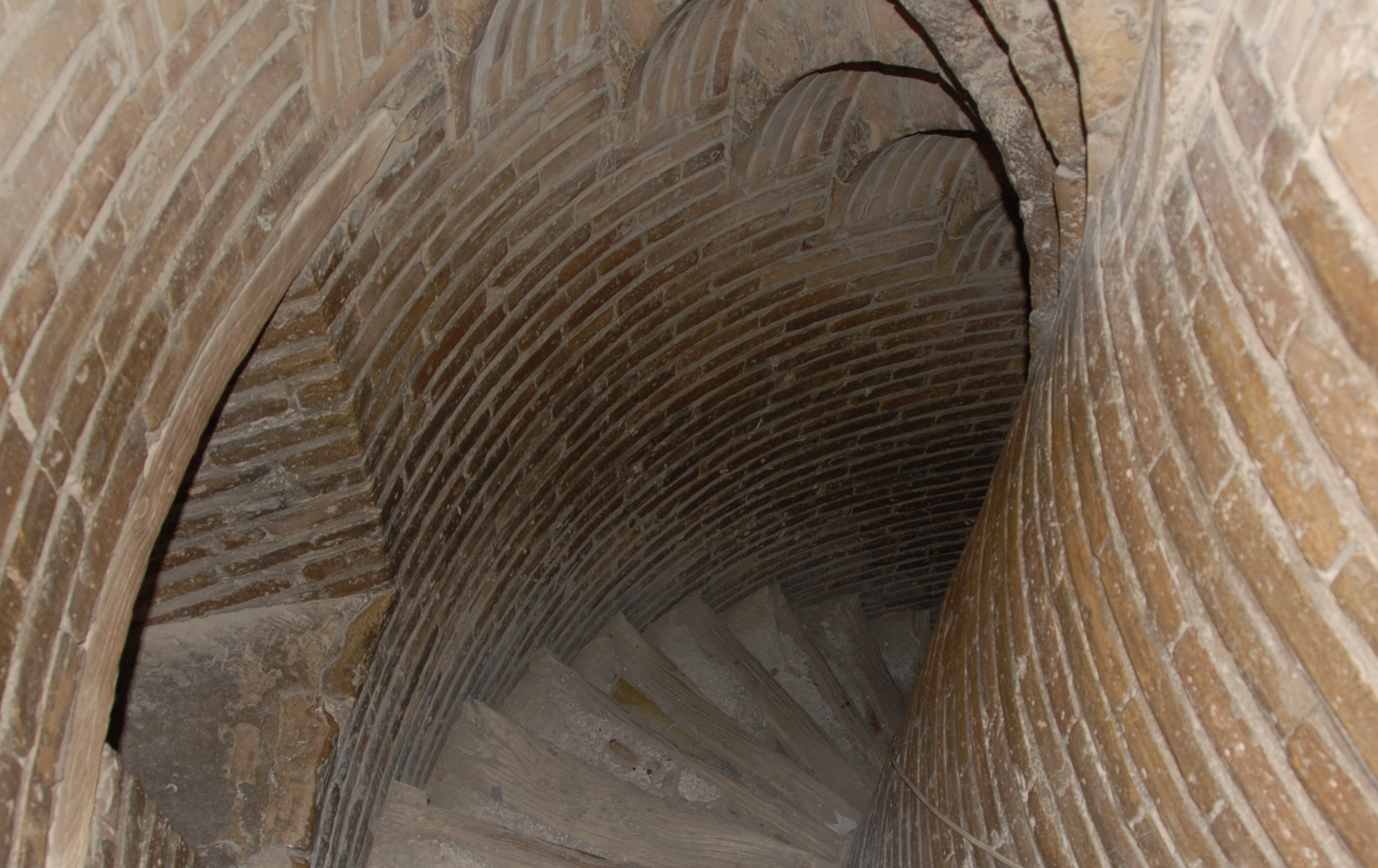
Interior staircase

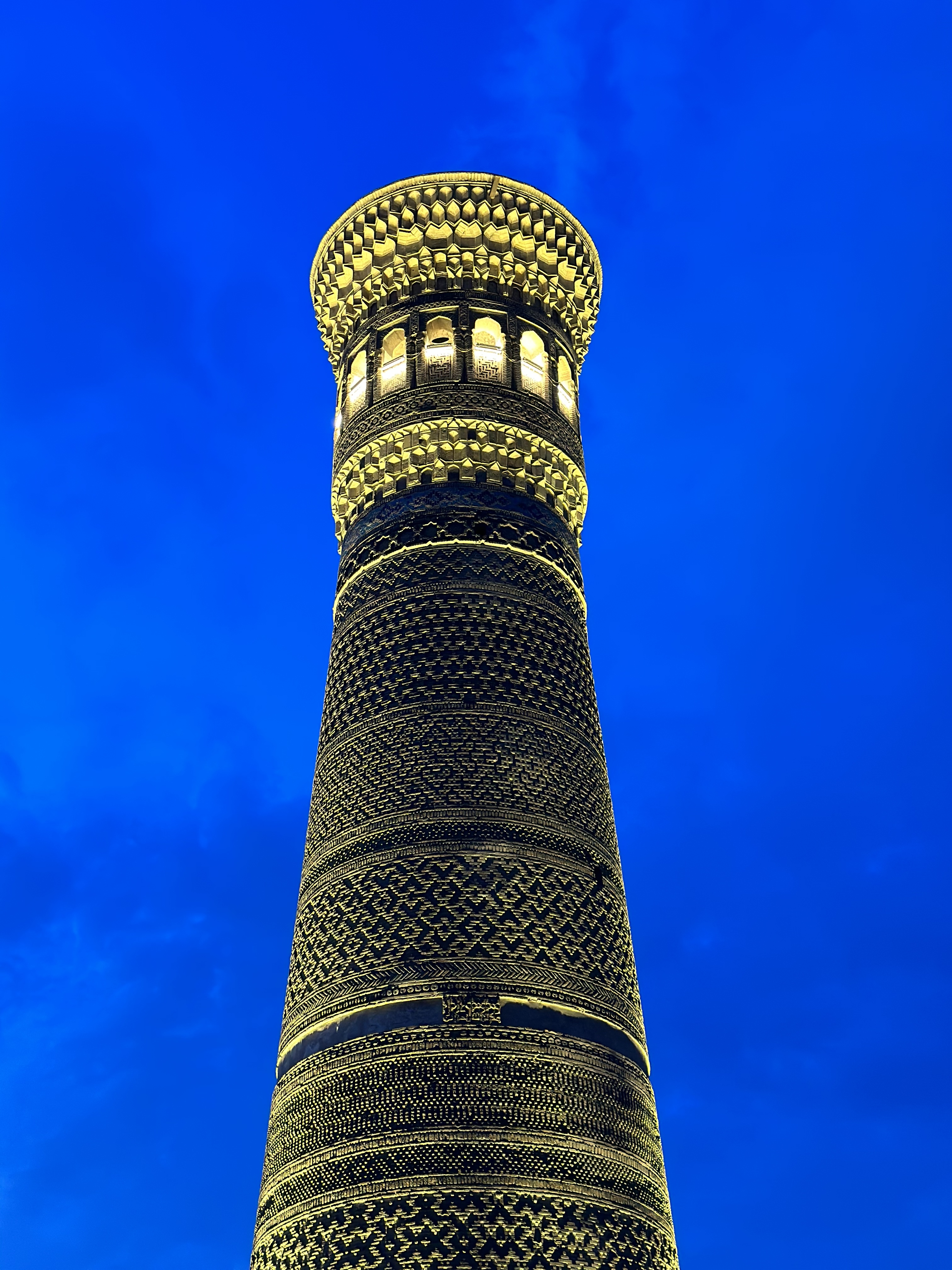
Tower (Minora) in the city of Bukhara

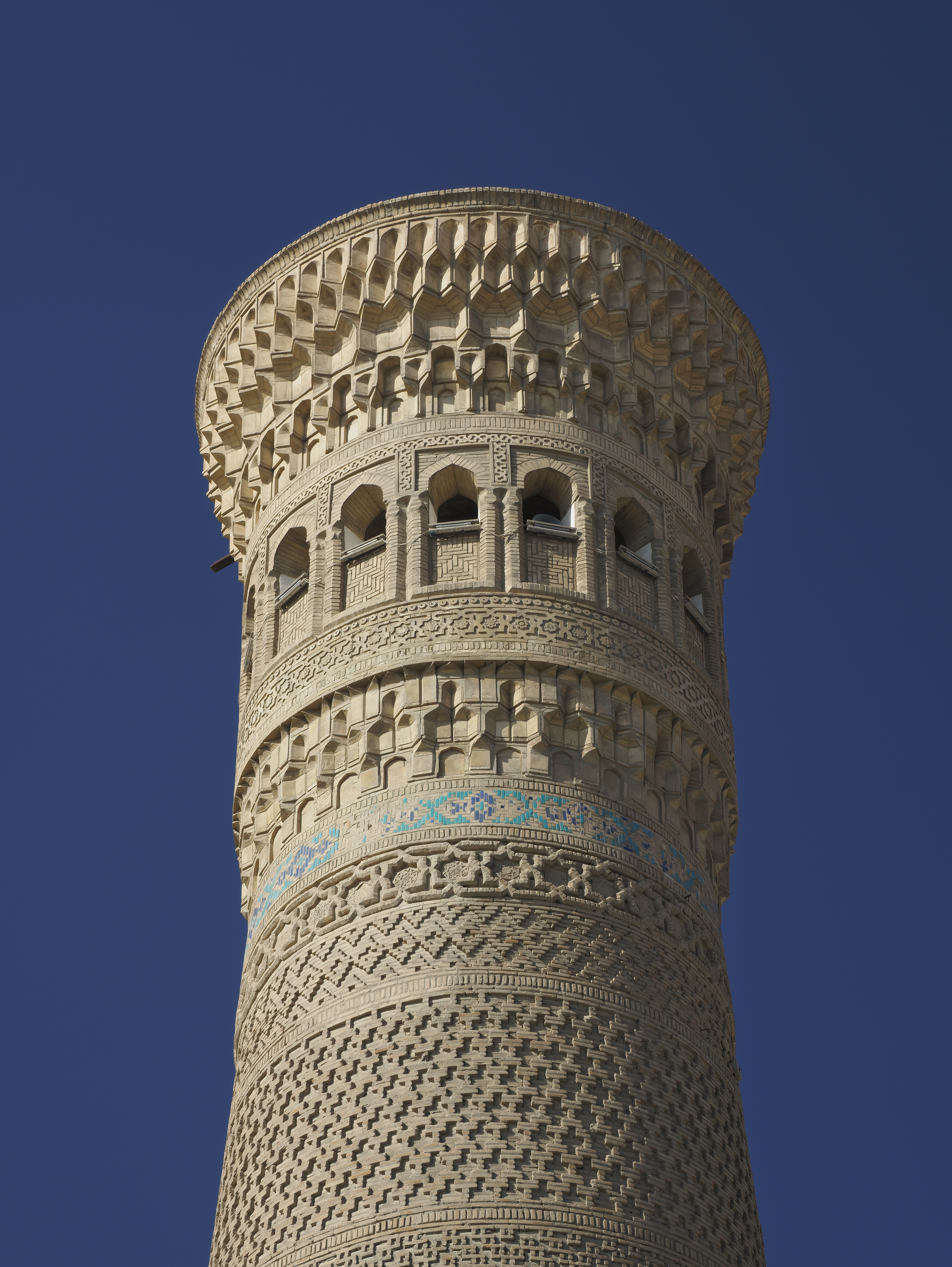
Detail of top

== See also ==
- List of tallest structures built before the 20th century
