= Mahmud Khoja Behbudiy =

Uzbek activist, writer and journalist (1875–1919)

Mahkmudkhodja Behbudiy
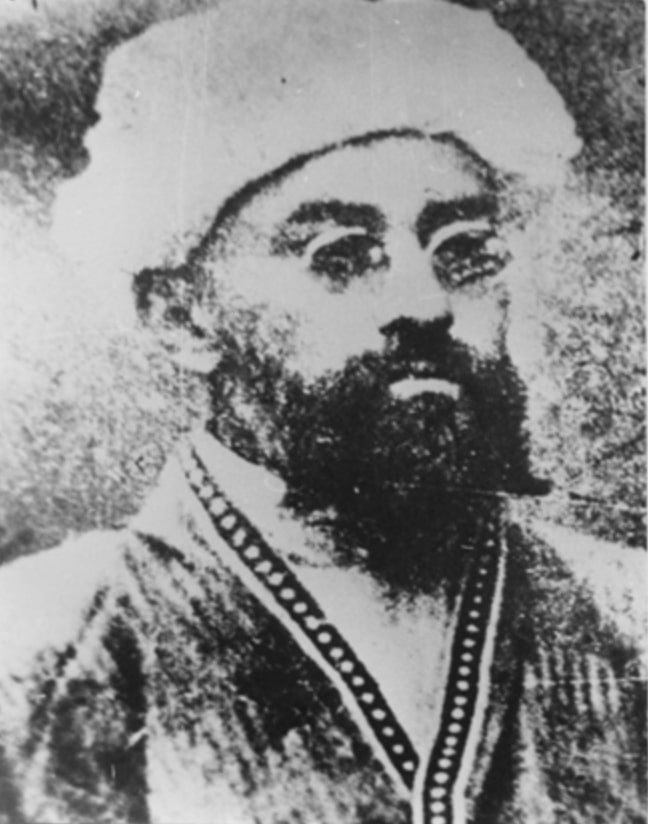
- Born: Mahmudkhodja ibn Behbud Chodscha; 20 January 1875; Samarkand, Russian Turkestan
- Died: 25 March 1919 (aged 44); Qarshi
- Occupations: Writer, journalist
- Writing career
- Movement: Jadidism

Mahkmudkhodja Behbudiy (Cyrillic Маҳмудхўжа Беҳбудий; Arabic script محمود خواجه بهبودی; born as Mahmudkhodja ibn Behbud Chodscha) (20 January 1875 in Samarkand – 25 March 1919 in Qarshi) was an Uzbek Jadid activist, writer, journalist and leading public figure in Imperial Russian and Soviet Turkestan.

== Life ==
Mehmudkhodja Behbudiy was born on 20 January 1875 (new calendar) on the outskirts of Samarkand in Russian Turkestan. Many members of his family were Islamic scholars, and Behbudiy too became a Qazi following his madrasah education. After an eight-month trip to Arabia, Transcaucasia, Istanbul and Cairo in 1899, which brought him into contact with the cultural movements in Islam in the wider world, he started his public career in Central Asia in 1903. He subscribed to Ismail Gaspirali's Tercüman and changed his name from ibn Behbud Chodscha to Behbudiy. He also wrote articles in support of Jadidism in all Central Asian newspapers and in 1913 launched Ayina ("The Mirror"), a weekly magazine, which he published almost by himself for twenty months. He also published the newspaper Samarkand. His friends included Siddiqiy Ajziy, Abduqodir Shakuriy and Haji Muin.

After the February Revolution in 1917, Behbudiy became one of the two Muslim members of the first executive committee in Samarkand. During the debate on territorial autonomy for Turkestan in the following months, Behbudiy was one of the few Jadids to argue in favor.

Behbudiy was arrested by the last Emir of Bukhara in Qarshi in 1919, probably while on his way to the Paris Peace Conference. After a period of torture, in which he also wrote his last will, he was executed. The city of Qarshi was later renamed Behbudiy in his honor from 1922 to 1937.

== Work ==
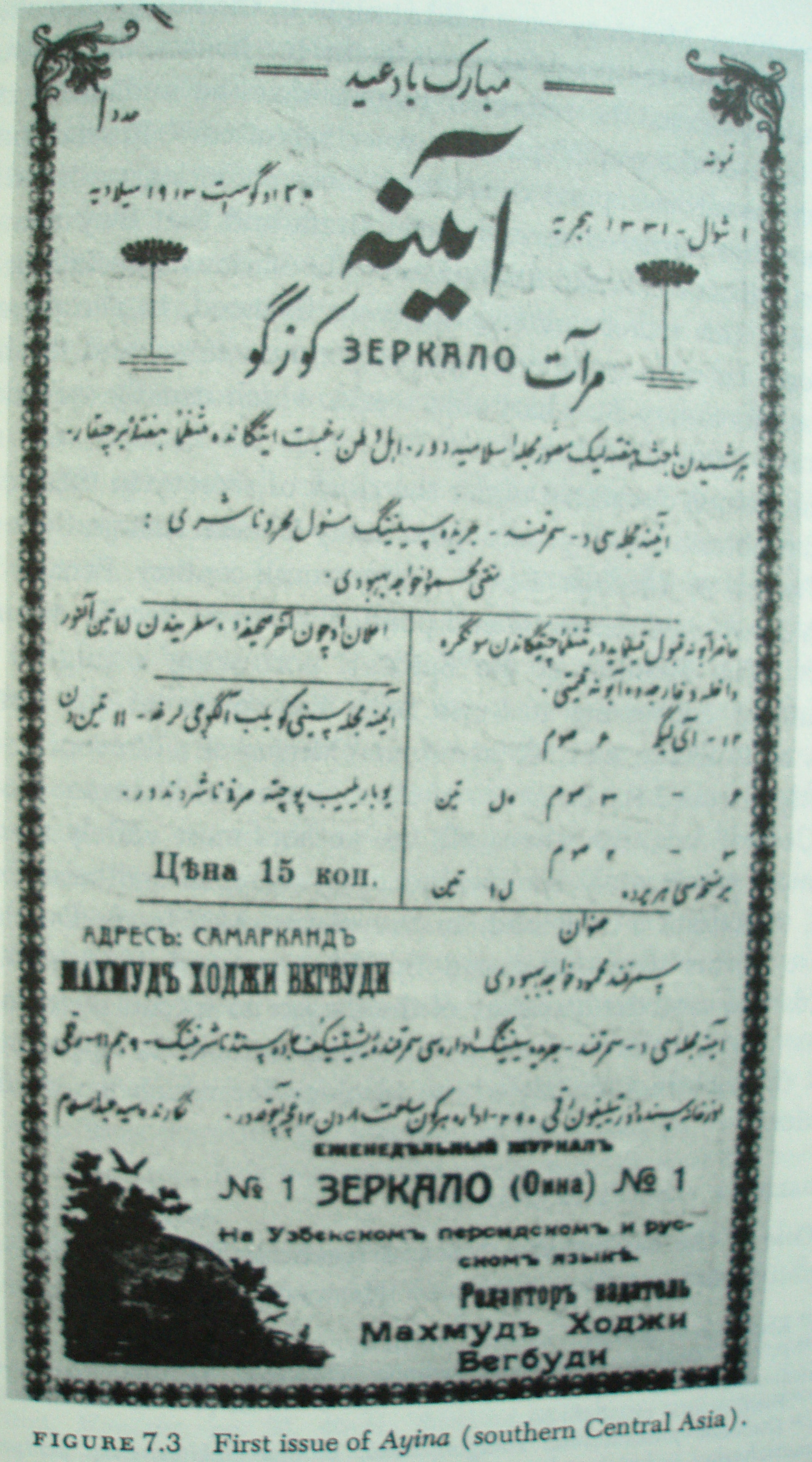
Title page of the first edition of Ayina

Behbudiy's work is divided into two phases by the Russian Revolution of 1917. Before it, Behbudiy wrote newspaper and magazine articles as well as textbooks, his first publication being an article in Turkiston viloyatining gazeti. He also established a reading room in Samarkand and promoted theatre, which he saw as an effective way to spread propaganda. In 1913, he also wrote the first modern Central Asian play with Padarkush ("The Patricide"), which was seen as a native counterweight against Tatar guest plays. Typical for modernist writing in Central Asia, many of his works had a strong educational message. After the revolution, he became directly involved in politics, attending congresses and giving speeches to Soviet government representatives.

One of his concerns was equal education opportunities for all citizens; he also fought for the rights of women and wanted both genders to be equal.

== Library "Behbudiya" ==
One of the positive deeds Behbudi started for the improvement of the country was the library "Behbudiya". Behbudi was one of the first to start a library. He published the first local newspaper and national magazine in Samarkand, wrote the first national drama, and was "the first theoretician and practitioner" of Methodist schools in Turkestan, as B. Kasimov noted.

On September 11, 1908, this library was inaugurated in the "Yangi rasta 99" after being granted official approval by the Governor of Samarkand.

However, the news of the library's opening was published a while ago. The "Turkiston viloyatining gazeti" ("Gazette of Turkistan Region") reported this. The program, which had 27 chapters, defined all of the library's official issues (Gazette of the Turkistan Region, 1908, No. 27). The annual membership cost to the library is 3 soums. The library's primary goal is to encourage local Muslim youth and madrasah students to pursue modern sciences.

His friends Haji Muin, Vasli Samarkandi, and instructor Abdulkadir Shakuriy helped him in establishing the library. The library quickly accumulated a sizable collection of priceless periodicals from the local, national, and international press. In particular, readers and users could read and use secular and religious literature from many nations, children's books, picture books, newspapers, dictionaries, atlases, and encyclopedias in the library.

The library first ran 14 hours a day with 200 and eventually 225 volumes of literature. The library has been open for seven months, has 125 members, and over that time has tended to the spiritual needs of nearly 2,000 readers. For library work, the first two years were helpful. A sufficient number of patrons and volunteers existed to sustain the library. But by 1910, he started to become less active. This was due to a number of factors. The main causes of this were primarily the battle between the ancient and the ancient, as well as the false accusations made by the ancient scholars against the ancient. The common people, who lacked education and comprehension of these issues, fought for his situation. The ulama reportedly labeled the library as an infidel and a dangerous location in the 16th issue of the "Gazette of the Turkistan Region" from 1910, and they issued a fatwa to parents not to send their kids to such places. The library was in total decay by 1912, when that year was born. The issue with money is on the agenda. Nevertheless, Behbudi's efforts allowed the library to keep running. The library was having a difficult time operating in the beginning of 1914. At the annual meeting this year, it was decided to stage a play with the help of 15 library patrons in order to save the institution and address its financial issues. But the library did not benefit from this event in any way. Behbudi wanted the country's library to serve the people for a very long time, but that is no longer the case. Behbudi then relocated the library to his yard. The name of it was Library "Behbudiya".

== Travels ==
On May 29, 1914, Behbudi went on a trip to Arab countries for the second time. During his trip, he visited to the cities such as Bayramali, Ashgabat, Krasnovodsk, Kislovodsk, Pyatigorsk, Zheleznovodsk, Rostov, Odessa, and arrived in Istanbul on June 8. From there he went to Adarna and returned to Istanbul and met with Ismail Gasprinsky on June 20. Then he went to Jerusalem, Beirut, Jaffa, Halil ar-Rahman, Port Said, Sham. Travel memories were published in magazine "Ayina". These memoirs were important in every way, and were a unique example of the traditional historical-memoir genre of early 20th-century. The author gave a lot of space to the impressions of the road and the instructive aspects of his meetings with people. No matter which city went to, he collected information about its history, monuments, and great people who came from that place. He was interested in different nations, their traditions and lifestyles. He especially attached great importance to matters of religion and faith.

=== Publishing ===
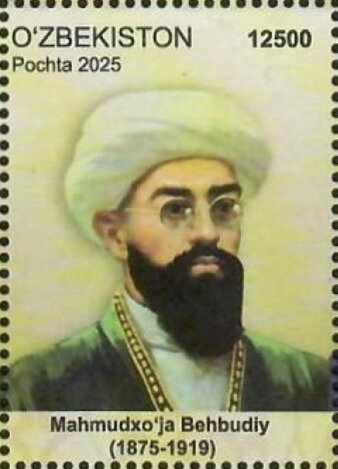
Behbudiy on a 2026 stamp of Uzbekistan

There isn't enough information on Behbudi's publishing house, despite the fact that there is a lot of evidence indicating he was also involved in the publishing field.

The volumes Behbudiy produced were printed in Samarkand printing houses because this publishing business did not have its own printing facility but rather functioned as a division of the library. The reason is that separate requirements had to be met for the printing house's equipment and funding at the same time.

Behbudiy's map of Turkestan, Bukhara, Khiva, textbooks, the drama "Padarkush", and Fitrat's "Hindi Traveler" were translated into Russian for the first time in "Nashriyoti Behbudiya."

For the schools that were established under his direction, Behbudiy authored and published textbooks. he was the only instructor who freely "distributed" them.

Even today, publishing houses, which are a part of libraries, are still actively working. Both "Nashriyoti Behbudiya" and "Library Behbudiya" were academic hubs that benefited the populace and enlightened the contemporary perception of Behbudiya.

== Works (selection) ==
During his lifetime, Behbudiy made important contributions to Uzbek literature. By the time of his death, he had written more than 200 articles, textbooks and theatre plays for various magazines and newspapers, including Tercüman and Vaqt.

- 1903: Muntaxabi jug'rofiyai umumiy (Textbook for Geography)
- 1904: Kitob-ul-atfol (Children's book)
- 1904: Muxtasari tarixi islom ("A Brief History of Islam")
- 1908: Russiyaning qisqacha jug'rofiyasi ("The Geography of Russia")
- 1913: Padarkush ("The Patricide")

=== Drama "Padarkush" ===
Behbudi wrote the drama "Padarkush" in 1911. This was the first Uzbek drama. This play with 3 acts and 4 scenes was simple in content and told the story of an uneducated, ignorant boy who killed his father. Behbudi called the genre of this work as "national tragedy". Czar's censorship does not allow the publication of this work. "Dedicated to the 100th anniversary of the Battle of Borodino and the liberation of Russia from the French invasion," it was censored in Tbilisi. The play was published in 1913, but it took another year to be staged. The play was staged in Samarkand on January 25, 1914. Drama has a strong influence on people. "Padarkush" was a work that started a new stage in Uzbek literature, both in terms of genre and content. The drama was re-enacted by Avloni on February 27, 1914, in Tashkent.

== Literature ==
- Adeeb Khalid: The Politics of Muslim Cultural Reform: Jadidism in Central Asia, Berkeley & Los Angeles 1998.
- Ahmad Aliyev: Madhmudkho'ja Behbudiy, Tashkent 1994.
- D. Alimova, D. Rashidova: Mahmod Khoja Behbudiy and his Historical Vision, Tashkent 1998.
- Charles Kurzman: Modernist Islam, 1840–1940. A Sourcebook, New York 2002, p. 257.
