= Abdurauf Fitrat =

Uzbek writer, politician and public intellectual (1886–1938)

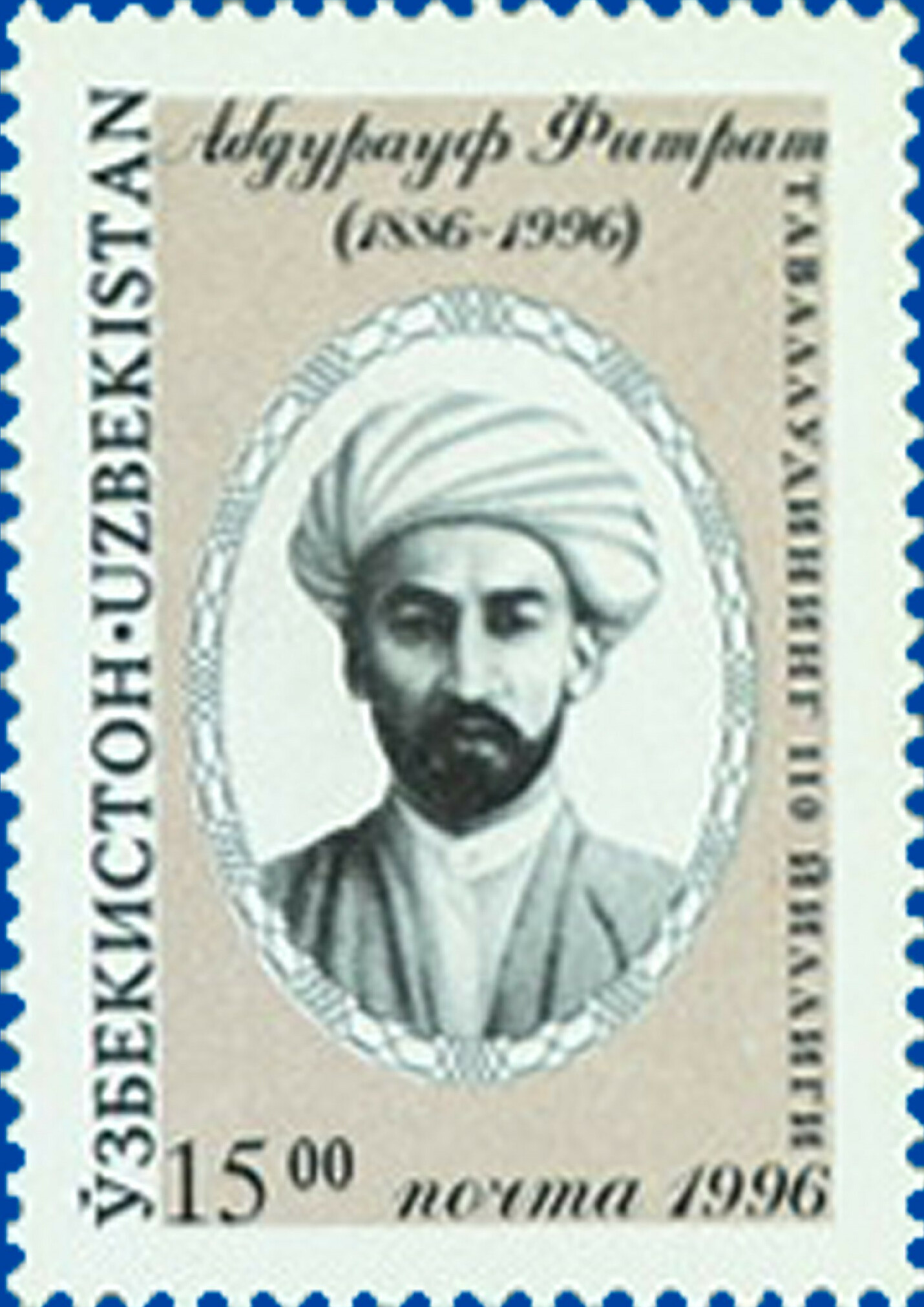
- Abdurauf Fitrat on an Uzbek stamp published in honour of his 110th birthday (1996)
- Born: 1886; Bukhara, Emirate of Bukhara
- Died: 4 October 1938; Tashkent, Uzbek SSR, Soviet Union
- Occupations: Teacher, theorist, politician, educator, writer, and scholar
- Writing career
- Movement: Jadidism

Signature
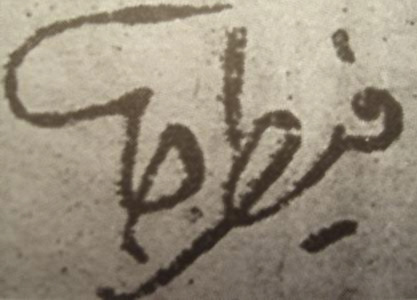

Abdurauf Fitrat (sometimes spelled Abdulrauf Fitrat or Abdurrauf Fitrat, Uzbek: Abdurauf Fitrat / Абдурауф Фитрат; 1886 – 4 October 1938) was an Uzbek author, journalist, politician and public intellectual in Central Asia under Russian and Soviet rule.

Fitrat made major contributions to modern Uzbek literature with both lyric and prose in Persian, Turki, and late Chagatai. Beside his work as a politician and scholar in many fields, Fitrat also authored poetic and dramatic literary texts. Fitrat initially composed poems and authored essays and polemic prose in the Persian language, but switched to a puristic Turkic tongue by 1917. Fitrat was responsible for the change to Uzbek as Bukhara's national language in 1921, before returning to writing texts in Tajik later during the 1920s. In the early 1920s, Fitrat took part in the efforts for Latinization of Uzbek and Tajik.

Fitrat was influenced by his studies in Istanbul during the early 1910s, where he came into contact with Islamic reformism and authored several philosophical essays. After returning to Central Asia, he turned into an influential ideological leader of the local jadid movement. In opposition to and in exile from the Bukharan emir he sided with the communists. After the end of the emirate, Fitrat accepted several posts in the government of the Bukharan People's Soviet Republic, before he was forced to spend a year in Russia. Later, he taught at several colleges and universities and held a research position at the Academy of Sciences of the then Uzbek SSR.

During Stalin's Great Purge, Fitrat was arrested and prosecuted for counter-revolutionary and nationalist activities, and finally executed in 1938. After his death, his work was banned for decades. Fitrat was rehabilitated in 1956, yet critical evaluation of his work has changed several times since. While there are Tajik criticis that call the likes of Fitrat "traitors", other writers have given him the title of a martyr (shahid), particularly in independent Uzbekistan.

== Naming variants ==
Fitrat's name has a number of variation across forms and transliterations: He mostly went by the pen name Fitrat (فطرت Fiṭrat, also transcribed as Fetrat or, according to the Uzbek spelling reform of 1921, Piträt). This name, derived from the Arabic term فطرة, fiṭra, meaning “nature, creation”, in Ottoman Turkish stood for the concept of nature and true religion. In Central Asia, however, according to the Russian turkologist Lazar Budagov, the same word was used to refer to alms given during Eid al-Fitr. In Persian and Tajik the notion of fitrat includes religion, creation and wisdom. Fitrat was used as a pen name before by the poet Fitrat Zarduz Samarqandi (late 17th to early 18th centuries). Abdurauf Fitrat's first known pseudonym was Mijmar (taken from the Arabic مجمر, miǧmar, “incensory”).

Fitrat's Arabic name is عبد الرؤوف بن عبد الرحيم ʿAbd ar-Raʾūf b. ʿAbd ar-Raḥīm (sometimes rendered عبد الرئوف), with Abdurauf as his proper name. During his Istanbul period he preferred to add the nisba Bukhārāī 'The Bukharan' to his name. In reformed Arabic script, Fitrat was depicted as فيطرەت or فيترەت. The Turkic variant of the nasab is Abdurauf Abdurahim oʻgʻli.

Some of the many Russian variants of his name are Абдурауф Абдурахим оглы Фитрат Abdurauf Abdurakhim ogly Fitrat and Абд-ур-Рауфъ Abd-ur-Rauf; Fitrats Soviet, russified name is Абдурауф Абдурахимов Abdurauf Abdurakhimow or, omitting the component Abd, Рауф Рахимович Фитрат Rauf Rakhimovich Fitrat. The variant Фитратов Fitratov can also be found. In Uzbek-Cyrillic script his name is to be depicted with Абдурауф Абдураҳим ўғли Фитрат; his name in modern Tajik is Абдуррауфи Фитрат Abdurraufi Fitrat.

Fitrat sometimes bore the titles of "hajji" and "professor".

== Life and work ==
=== Education in Bukhara ===
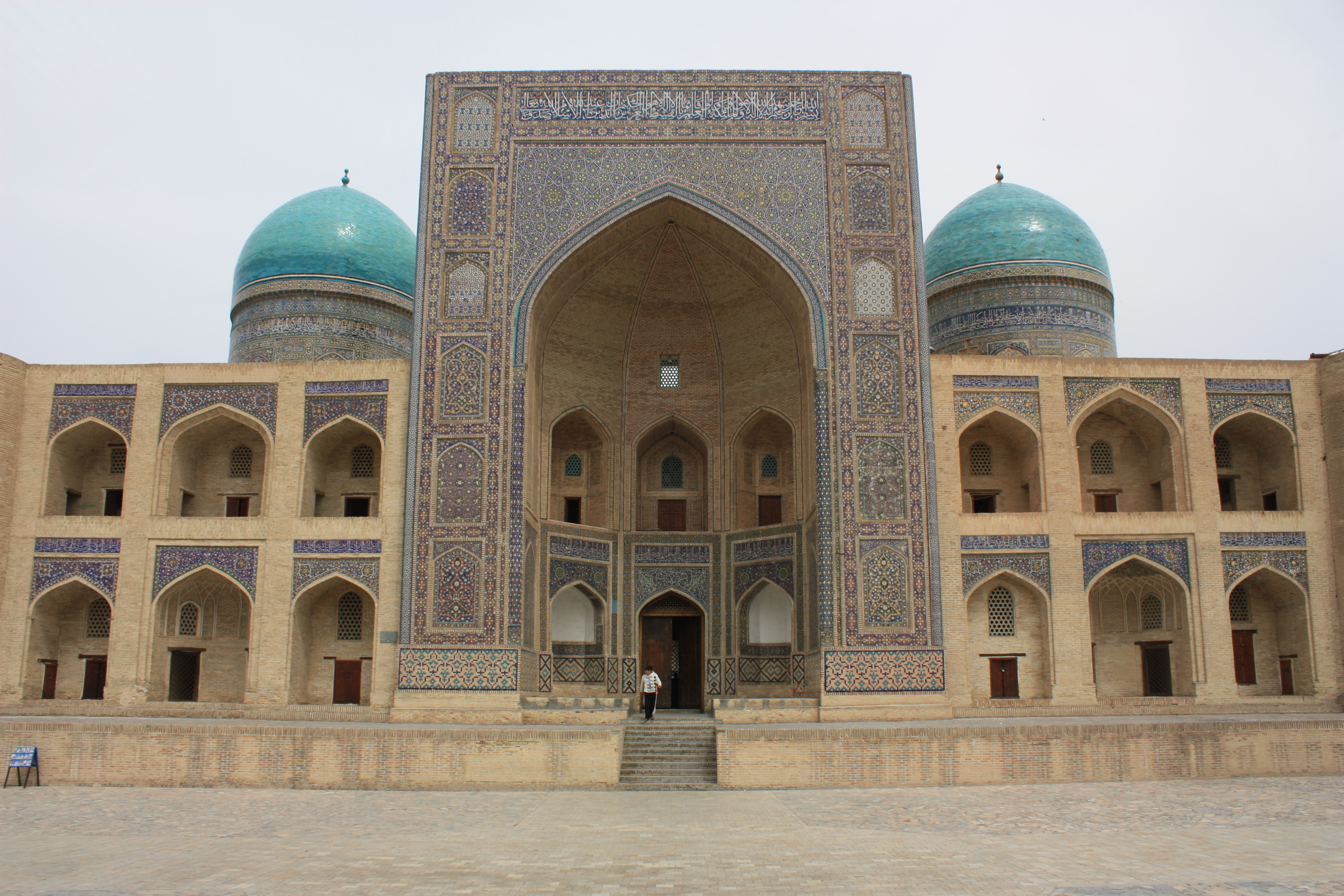
The Mir-i-Arab Madrasa in Bukhara

Fitrat was born in 1886 (he himself stated 1884) in Bukhara. Little is known about his childhood, which is, according to Adeeb Khalid, characteristic for Central Asian figures of this era. His father Abdurahimboy was a devout Muslim and a trader, who would leave the family in the direction of Margilan and later Kashgar. Fitrat came by most of his worldly education through his broadly read mother, named Mustafbibi, Nastarbibi or Bibijon according to varied sources. According to Edward A. Allworth she brought him into contact with the works of Bedil, Fuzûlî, Ali-Shir Nava'i and others. Abdurauf grew up with a brother (Abdurahmon) and a sister (Mahbuba).

Muhammadjon Shakuri suggests that Firat completed the hajj together with his father during his childhood. After receiving education at a maktab-type school Fitrat is said to have begone studies at the Mir-i Arab Madrasa of Bukhara in 1899 and to have completed them in 1910. As Shakuri continues, Fitrat travelled extensively through Russian Turkestan and the Emirate of Bukhara between 1907 and 1910. The literary scholar Begali Qosimov thinks that Fitrat studied in Bukhara until he was 18 and that he completed the hajj between 1904 and 1907, also visiting Turkey, Iran, India and Russia. According to Zaynobidin Abdurashidov, it was in the beginning of the 20th century that Fitrat went on a pilgrimage through Asia to Mecca during which he spent some time in India, where he earned some money for the journey home as a barber. As per Abdurashidov, Fitrat was already known as a poet then, using the pen name Mijmar. Beside Shakuri, also Khalid and Allworth mention the Mir-i Arab Madrasa as Fitrat's place of study in Bukhara. While studying at the madrasah Fitrat was also instructed in ancient Greek philosophy by his teacher.

In his autobiography, published in 1929, Fitrat wrote that Bukhara had been one of the darkest religious centres. He had been a devout Muslim and initially in opposition to the reform movement of the Jadids (usul-i jadid ‚new method‘). Fitrat himself never received basic education in that "new method". According to Sadriddin Aini Fitrat was known as one of the most enlightened and commendable students of the time in Bukhara, whilst being effectively unknown outside the city until 1911. Abdurashidov's explanation of why Fitrat did not take part in the activities of the first group of jadids in Bukhara refers to the strict, anti-liberal regime under emir 'Abd al-Ahad Khan. Abdurashidov continues that Fitrat became interested in reformist ideas approximately in 1909 and suggests that this happened under the influence of the magazine Sırat-ı Müstakim by Mehmet Âkif Ersoy. Together with other magazines and newspapers, this magazine circulated among Bukhara's students during this time. Beyond that, Mahmudkhodja Behbudiy was a mentor to Fitrat. After completing his education Fitrat taught at a madrasah for a short period.

=== Stay in Istanbul and Jadid leader ===
Around 1909, jadid actors in Bukhara and Istanbul (Constantinople) built an organizational infrastructure in order to enable Bukharan students and teachers to study in the capital of the Ottoman Empire. According to reports, Fitrat himself was involved in these activities. Thanks to a grant given by the secret "society for the education of the children" (Tarbiyayi atfol) which was financed by merchants Fitrat himself was able to go to Istanbul. He arrived there in spring of 1910 shortly after the very first group. "Sometimes", says Sarfraz Khan from the University of Peshawar, Fitrat's departure to Turkey is described as an effort to flee from the persecution by the authorities after a conflict between Shia and Sunni Muslims in Bukhara in January 1910. Other authors date Fitrat's leaving to the year 1909.

During Fitrat's stay, in the Second Constitutional Era, Istanbul was governed by the Young Turks. These historical circumstances influenced Fitrat, the activities and the general social surroundings of the Bukharan students in Istanbul heavily. What Fitrat did after his arrival in Istanbul is not known exactly. According to Abdurashidov's analysis, Fitrat was integrated in the Bukharan diasporic community (he often gets mentioned as one of the founders of the benevolent society Buxoro ta’mimi maorif), he worked as a vendor at a bazaar, as a street cleaner, and as an assistant cook. Apart from that, he prepared for the entry exams at a madrasah, which he – according to Abdirashidov – probably passed mid-1913. This allowed him to become one of the first students of the Vaizin madrasah, which was founded in December 1912 and which used the "new method". Here he did not only receive lessons in Islamic science, but also in Oriental literature.

Other authors state that Fitrat spent the years between 1909 and 1913 studying at the Darülmuallimin, a training institute for teachers, or at the University of Istanbul. During his stay Fitrat became acquainted with further Middle Eastern reform movements, got into contact with the Pan-Turanist movement and with emigrants from the Tsardom of Russia, and turned into the leader of the jadids in Istanbul. He wrote several minor pieces in which he – always in Persian language – demanded reforms in the social and cultural life of Central Asia and a will to progress. His first texts were published in the Islamist newspapers Hikmet, published by Şehbenderzâde Filibeli Ahmed Hilmi, and Sırat-ı Müstakim, furthermore in Behbudiys Oyina and the Turkist Türk Yurdu. In his texts Fitrat pushed for the unity of all Muslims and portrayed Istanbul with the Ottoman sultan as the center of the Muslim world.

Two of the three booklets Fitrat published during his stay in Istanbul, the "Debate between a Teacher from Bukhara and a European" (Munozara, 1911) and the "Tales of an Indian Traveller" (Bayonoti sayyohi hindi), achieved great popularity in Central Asia Munozara was translated into Turkestani Turkish by Hoji Muin from Samarkand in 1911. It was published in the Tsarist newspaper Turkiston viloyatining gazeti and later as a book. While the Persian version did not, a Turkish version circulated in Bukhara as well. The latter version was expanded by a foreword by Behbudiy. Behbudiy also translated Bayonoti sayyohi hindi into Russian, and he convinced Fitrat to expand Munozara by a plea to learn Russian.

The outbreak of the First World War rendered Fitrat's completion of his studies in Istanbul impossible and forced him, like many other Bukharan students, to return to Transoxania prematurely.

=== The final years of an emirate ===
After his return to Bukhara Fitrat took an active role in the movement for reforms, especially in the fight for "new method" schools, and turned into the leader of the left wing of the local jadid movement. During Fitrat's stay in Istanbul, Sayyid Mir Muhammad Alim Khan had taken over the throne of the Emirate of Bukhara after his father's death. The new emir's announcements of sociopolitical reforms caused Fitrat to initially express his sympathy toward him and to urge the local ulama to support the emir's initiatives. As archive documents show, it was in 1914 that Fitrat started to act in an amateur theater in Bukhara.

According to Sadriddin Ayni, at that time Fitrat's literary work revolutionised the cosmos of ideas in Bukhara. In 1915 in his work Oila ("Family"), Fitrat was one of the first reformers to write about the hard life of women in Turkestan. Another text written in this timeframe is a schoolbook about the history of Islam, meant for use in reformed schools, and a collection of patriotic poems. In Rahbari najot ("The guide to salvation", 1916) he explained his philosophy on the basis of the Qur'an. He became a member of the Young Bukharans and met Fayzulla Khodzhayev in 1916. Subsequently, his ties to panturkism grew stronger, and in 1917 Fitrat started to predominantly use a puristic Turkic tongue in his publications. In early 1917 he met the poet, playwright, novelist and translator Choʻlpon, who went on to be one of his closest friends for the rest of his life.

Until 1917 Fitrat and other members of his movement were hopeful that the Bukharan emir would take a leading role in the task of reforming Bukhara. However, in April 1917 Fitrat had to flee the city because of the growing level of repression. He firstly went to Samarkand, where in August (edition 27) he became columnist and publisher of the newspaper Hurriyat. He stayed in this position until 1918 (edition 87). In late 1917, together with Usmonxoʻja oʻgʻli he penned a reformist agenda on behalf of the Central Committee of the Young Bukharan party. In it he proposed the implementation of a constitutional monarchy under the leadership of the emir and with the sharia as the legal basis. This programme was adopted by the Central Committee in January 1918 with minor changes.

After Kolesov's unsuccessful campaign in March 1918 Fitrat went on to Tashkent (then part of the Turkestan Autonomous Soviet Socialist Republic), where he worked in the Afghan consulate and where he served as an organizer of the nationalist intellectuals. In Tashkent he founded the multi-ethnic intellectual circle Chigʻatoy gurungi ("Chagataian discussion forum"). During the next two years, this was the breeding ground of a growing Chagataian nationalism. His text Temurning sogʻonasi ("Timur's mausoleum", 1918) showed a turn towards Pan-Turkism: A "son of a Turkic people" and "watcher of the border of Turan" prays for the resurrection of Timur at his grave and the rebuilding of the Timurid Empire.

After having been critical about the February Revolution and the Bolsheviks' coming into power the publication of secret treaties between the Tsardom, Great Britain and France by the Bolsheviks and the decline of the Ottoman Empire made him realize "who the real enemies of the Muslim, and especially the Turkic, world are": As he thought, the British now had the whole Arab world - with the exception of Hejaz - under their control and were enslaving 350 million Muslims. Since he felt it was their duty to be enemies of the British, Fitrat now supported the Soviets. This view provoked resistance by fellow activists like Behbudiy, Ayni and others. Nevertheless, in his analysis of Asian politics (Sharq siyosati, "Eastern politics", 1919), Fitrat argued for a strategic alliance between the Muslim world and Soviet Russia and against the politics of European powers which controlled India, Egypt and Persia, therefore especially against Britain.

During his exile Fitrat and his party wing inside the Young Bukharans became members of the Communist Party of Bukhara. In June 1919 he was elected into the Central Committee during the first party congress. Thereupon Fitrat worked in the party press, taught in the first Soviet schools and institutes of higher education, and edited the sociopolitical and literary journal Tong ("Dawn"), a publication of the Communist Party of Bukhara, in April and May 1920.

Sarfraz Khan suggests that by 1920 Fitrat had accepted that his reform ideas would not be transacted in the emirate. Because of that he started to endorse the idea that the emirate should be replaced by a people's republic. Together with his comrades he organized the Turkestan Bureau of the Young Bukharan Party under the leadership of Fayzulla Xo'jayev, which mobilized against the emir parallel to the Communist Party of Bukhara.

=== Fitrat as statesman in the people's republic ===
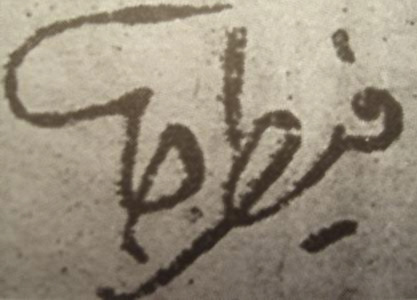
Fitrat's signature (in the form فيطرەت) on a 2.500 Soʻm banknote of the Bukharan People's Republic (1922)

In September 1920, the emir of Bukhara was overthrown by the Young Bukharans and the Red Army under Mikhail Frunze. Fitrat returned to Bukhara in December 1920 with a scientific expedition whose goal was to collect Bukhara's rich cultural heritage. After that, he took part in the state leadership of the new Bukharan People's Soviet Republic, starting as the head of the national Waqf authority which administered pious foundations, until 1921, later as foreign minister (1922), minister of education (1923), deputy chairman of the council for work of the Bukharan People's Soviet Republic and momentarily as minister for military and finances (1922).

In March 1921, Fitrat ordered the language of instruction to be changed from Persian to Uzbek, which also became the official language of Bukhara. The next year Fitrat sent 70 students to Germany so they could teach at the newly founded University of Bukhara after their return. During his time as minister for education Fitrat implemented changes in the instruction at madrasas, opened the "School for Oriental Music" and supervised the gathering of the country's cultural heritage. With commentaries on fatwas and with guidelines regarding which sources of law local muftis should use Fitrat, as minister for education, also exerted some influence on jurisdiction.

After their reunion with the communists, Young Bukharans dominated the power structure of the people's republic. Fitrat and like-minded companions managed to coexist with the Bolsheviks for some time, but Basmachi activists in the center and the east of the republic and a dispute about the presence of Russian troops overcomplicated the situation. Fitrat voiced his disapproval of Bolshevik misjudgments in Central Asian affairs in his Qiyomat ("The Last Judgment", 1923). Together with the head of government, Fayzulla Xo'jayev, he tried without success to ally with Turkey and Afghanistan to secure Bukhara's independence

Instigated by the Soviet plenipotentiary the then political leaders with nationalist tendencies, including Fitrat, but not Khodzhayev, were ousted and expulsed to Moscow on 25 June 1923. Fitrat's Chigʻatoy gurungi, which the pro-Soviets considered an "antirevolutionary bourgeois nationalist organization", was also closed down in 1923.

=== Fitrat's career as a scholar ===
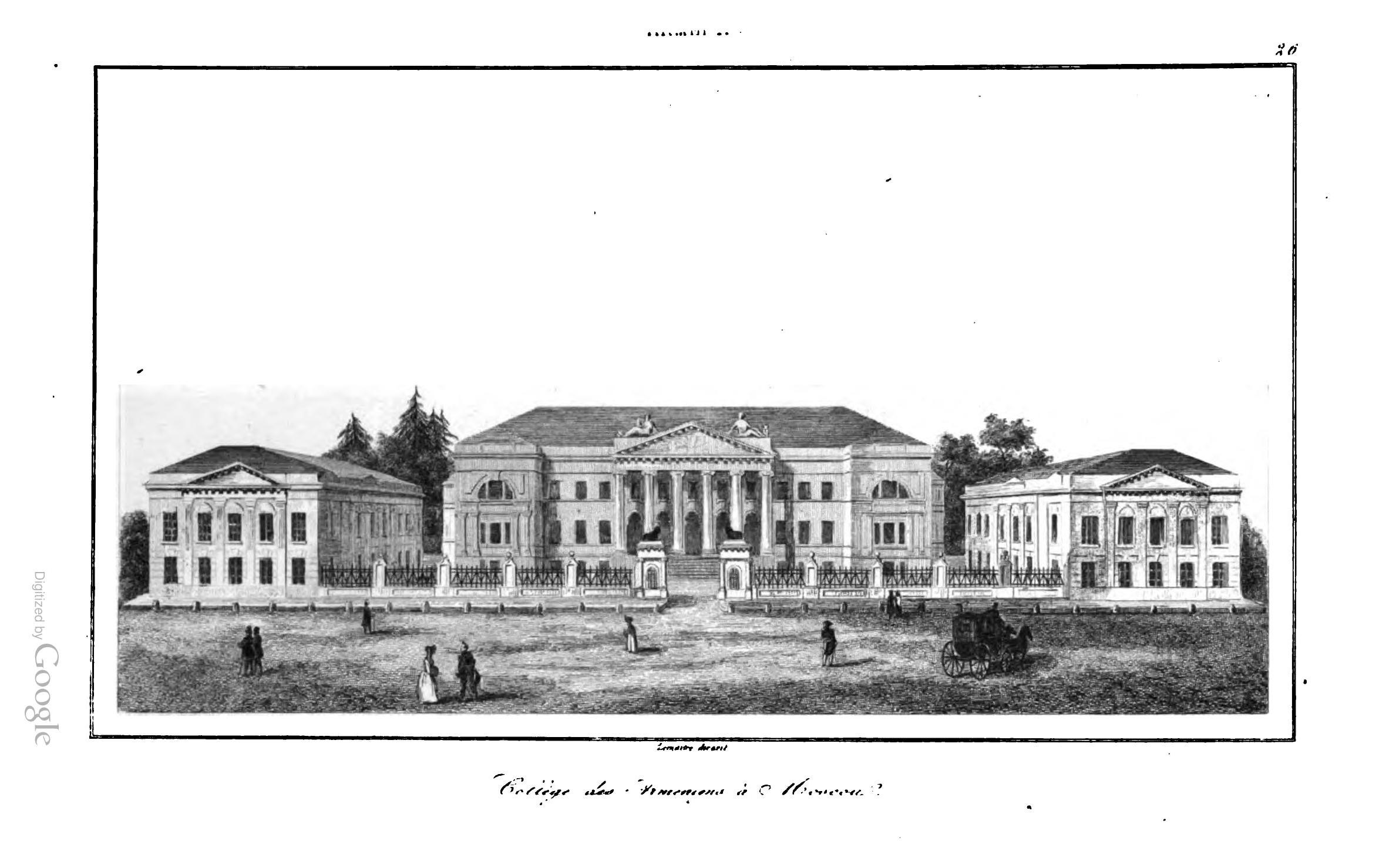
The Lazarev Institute in 1838, according to reports in 1923 the location of Fitrat's work in exile, now seat of the Armenian embassy in Moscow

After Bukhara had lost its independence and changed side from nationalism and Muslim reformism to secular communism, Fitrat wrote a number of allegories in which he criticized the new political system in his homeland. He had unavoidably withdrawn from politics and committed himself to teaching. Between 1923 and 1924 he spent 14 months in exile in Moscow. Little is known about Fitrat's time in Moscow, even though he published important enlightenmental works such as Ro'zalar "Fasting in Ramadan" and Shaytonning Tangriga Isyoni "Satan's Revolt against God" (1924). According to Uzbek scholars Fitrat worked at the Lazarev Institute of Oriental Languages in Moscow, and later received the title of professor from the Institute for Oriental Studies at Petrograd (St. Petersburg) University, but, according to Khalid, there is no documentary evidence for these claims.

After his return to Central Asia in September 1924 there was dispute between former Tashkent Young Communists around Akmal Ikramov and former Young Bukharans around Fayzulla Khodzhayev regarding Fitrat's persona in the newly established Uzbek SSR. Khodzhayev stood up for Fitrat and was, according to Adeeb Khalid, at least partially responsible for Fitrat's freedom and ability to keep publishing. Fitrat avoided serious involvement in the affairs of the new state and is said to have declined the option to teach at the Central Asian Communist University or to work permanently at the Commissariat of Education.

Subsequently, he taught at several colleges in the Uzbek SSR, after 1928 at Samarkand University. In the same year, he became a member of the Academic Council of the Uzbek SSR. In his academic activity as historian of literature he stayed true to his own beliefs rather than to the conformity demanded by the Communist Party. After 1925, this included criticism against the communist theory of national cultures in the supra-ethnic structure of Central Asia, which brought him the reputation of a political subversive in Communist circles. The communists believed to recognize hidden messages in Fitrat's works and accused him of political subversion. Meanwhile, a new generation of Soviet writers had formed in Uzbekistan's literary scene. During this phase of his life Fitrat married the approximately 17-year-old Fotimaxon, a sister of Mutal Burhonov, who would leave Fitrat after a short time.

Fitrat wrote two works dealing with Central Asian Turk languages (in 1927 and 1928), in which he denied the necessity to segregate Soviet Central Asia along ethnic lines. Around this time Communist ideologues, the next generation of writers and the press began criticizing Fitrat's perspective towards questions of nationality and labelling his way of presenting classics of Chagataian literature as "nationalist", thus non-Soviet. This "Chagataiism" would later be one of the heaviest accusations against Fitrat. In this campaign Jalil Boyboʻlatov, a chekist who had pursued Fitrat since the time of the Bukharan People's Soviet Republic and now analyzed Fitrat's writings on the history of literature, was a pivotal character. Even Fitrat's several literary pieces in support of the anti-religious campaigns which culminated in 1926-28 could not outweigh the allegations raised against him.

Fitrat wrote his last book with political relevance on Emir Alim Khan in Persian (Tajik) in 1930. After 1932, Fitrat became a powerful control instance of political and social activity in his homeland. Fitrat felt the necessity to acquaint the following generation of literates with the traditional rules of prosody (aruz), since by the 1930s the Uzbek language had become emphatically contemporary and ruralist and therefore detached from historical poetry.

From 1932 onwards writers had to be member of the writers' union in order to have their texts published. During this time Fitrat wrote a poem in praise of cotton which was published in a Russian language anthology. Apart from this instance Fitrat was technically excluded from the press and dedicated himself to teaching. He eventually received the title of professor from the Institute of Language and Literature in Tashkent, but in the mid-1930s he was attacked by his students on a regular basis. His last play, Toʻlqin ("the wave", 1936), was a protest against the practice of censorship.

=== The end in the Great Purge ===
On the night of 23 April 1937 Fitrat's home was paid a visit by NKVD forces and Fitrat was arrested the following day. For over 40 years his further fate was unknown to the public. Only the release of archive material during the era of glasnost revealed the circumstances of Fitrat's disappearance.

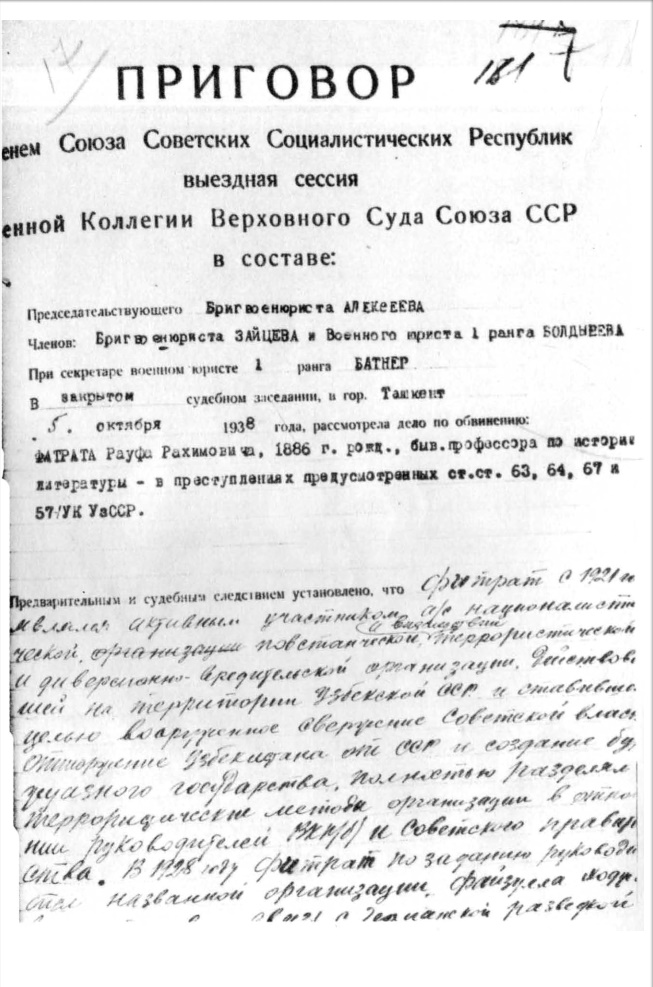
Decision of the Supreme Court of the Soviet Union, 5 October 1938

Fitrat was suspected to be a member of a counter-revolutionary nationalist organization who had tried to recruit young writers for his ideas, who had compiled texts in the spirit of counter-revolutionary nationalism, and who had striven for splitting off a bourgeois Turanic state from the Soviet Union. He was prosecuted as "one of the founders and leaders of the counter-revolutionary nationalist jadidism" and as an organizer of a "nationalist pan-Turkic counter-revolutionary movement against the party and the Soviet government" according to articles 67 and 66 (1) of the criminal code of the Uzbek SSR. Referring to archival documents Begali Qosimov reports that these and further allegations were investigated for months, and finally Fitrat was also accused of treason according to article 57 (1). According to secret files, Fitrat broke during questioning and was willing to admit any ideological crime.

The case was discussed on 4 October 1938 by the Military Collegium of the Supreme Court of the Soviet Union, whereupon, according to the transcript, a 15 minutes long show trial took place the following day without hearing witnesses. The trial ended with Fitrat's sentence to death by a firing squad and confiscation of all goods. Archival documents show that the execution was carried out on 4 October 1938, thus on the day before his conviction.

Said archival documents also show that at the time of his arrest Fitrat was living together with his mother, his 25-year-old wife Hikmat and his 7-year-old daughter Sevar in the mahallah of Guliston in the city of Tashkent. His wife was arrested together with Fitrat, but released in January 1938. 1957, after Fitrat's rehabilition, an apology was communicated to her.

== Legacy and criticism ==
In the beginning, the Soviet Union discouraged the memory of Fitrat and his followers. After the celebrations at Ali-Shir Nava'i's 500th birthday according to the Islamic calendar in 1926 the Soviets held another celebration in the year of 1941, during Nava'i's 500th birthday according to the solar calendar. Instead of remembering a master of Chagatai literature, these celebrations remembered the "father of Uzbek literature" and were labelled as the "triumph of Leninist-Stalinist nationality politics". Fitrat's texts were banned until Stalin's death like those of the other Uzbekistani literates who became victims of the Great Purge in October 1938. Nevertheless, they were circulating among students and intellectuals. In the Third Reich, Hind ixtilolchilari was published again in 1944 with the participation of Annemarie von Gabain for the purpose of anti-Soviet propaganda.

While he was posthumously rehabilitated in 1956 due to the activity of the critic Izzat Sulton and his achievements in the areas of literature and education now recognized, the Soviet press continued criticizing him for his liberal and the Tajiks for his Turkophile tendencies. Almost all his works remained banned until perestroika. However, some copies of Fitrat's dramas were preserved in academic libraries. For a long time, Fitrat was remembered as an Uzbek or Turkish nationalist. While his prose started being recognized by Uzbek scholars of literature in the 1960s and '70s and several stories were once again published, explicitly negative comments were still in circulation up to the '80s. Even in the '90s sources on Fitrat in Uzbekistan were still scarce. Only after 1989 several works of Fitrat were printed in Soviet magazines and newspapers.

According to Halim Kara's studies three historical periods of Fitrat's rehabilitation can be distinguished in Uzbekistan: In the course of de-Stalinization the then First Secretary of the Uzbek Central Committee of the Communist Party of Uzbekistan Nuritdin Mukhitdinov announced the rehabilitation of Fitrat and other Jadid writers, however, unlike Abdulla Qodiriy Fitrat did not receive an ideological reassessment. Fitrat was still portrayed as a bourgeois nationalist and opponent to socialist ideology. This picture was also drawn in the Uzbek Soviet Encyclopedia which was published between 1971 and 1980.

The second period corresponds with the time of perestroika. Due to Temur Poʻlatov's call the Uzbek Writers' Union built a commission in 1986 whose task was to investigate Choʻlpon's and Fitrat's literary heritage. The allegations against Fitrat of before essentially were not removed, but the pro-Soviet phase of his oeuvre was now acknowledged. Certain texts, particularly those written under Bolshevik power, were republished with commentaries by literature critics as supplement. The reevaluation of Fitrat's controversial works in the light of Marxist–Leninist ideology which was initially planned by the commission could, according to Kara, not be carried out under the control of the conservative government of the Uzbek SSR of that time. However, the commission's conclusions and the principle of glasnost made further discourse possible. A group of conservative writers like Erkin Vohidov tried to bring Fitrat's texts into accordance with the applicable principles of Soviet literary politics and to explain the "ideological errors" as misunderstanding or lack of knowledge of Marxist–Leninist ideology. Another group around the literary critics Matyoqub Qoʻshjonov and Naim Karimov demanded Fitrat's full rehabilitation and the unreserved republication of his writings. For them, Fitrat's work was not ideologically inadmissible. Instead, the importance for the cultural heritage and for the development of a national literature were articulated in this pro-Uzbek trend. As Shawn T. Lyons showed, during perestroika also parts of the general public demanded a complete clarification of the circumstances of Fitrat's disappearance and his full rehabilitation. Contrary to the line of the party, Izzat Sulton classified Fitrat as an important advocate of Soviet socialism.

The third period Kara analyzed is the Republic of Uzbekistan in independence. The decolonization and de-Sovietization of Uzbek national discourses led to Fitrat's works being published again uncensored. In 1991 the Uzbek government awarded the State Prize of Literature to Fitrat and Choʻlpon in recognition of their contribution to the development of modern Uzbek literature and national identity. Fitrat's dedication for an independent Turkestan received a new interpretation by the anti-Russian Uzbek intelligentsia: Now it was the lack of socialist properties that became highlighted. According to Kara, the Uzbek literary elite actually ignores or talks down the pro-Soviet components in Fitrat's work. As Kara explains, distancing Fitrat's oeuvre from the changeable reality of his lifetime is a legacy of Soviet academia, where either positive or negative properties of a person were exaggerated. Kara suggests that this narrative strategy of seeing things in only black or white, with a different backdrop, has now been adopted by the Uzbeks. In 1996, Fitrat's native city of Bukhara dedicated the Abdurauf Fitrat Memorial Museum to the "eminent public and political figure, publicist, scholar, poet, and expert on the history of the Uzbek and Tajik nations and their spiritual cultures". Alexander Djumaev noted in 2005 that in the recent past Fitrat had received a sanctified status in Uzbekistan and that he frequently got labelled as a martyr (shahid). In several other Uzbek cities, including the capital Tashkent, streets or schools have been named after Fitrat.

Not only Uzbeks, but also a number of Tajiks claim Fitrat's literary legacy for themselves. Authors like Sadriddin Ayni and Mikhail Zand argue in favour of Fitrat's importance for the development of the Tajik language and especially of Tajik literature. Ayni, for example, called Fitrat a "pioneer of Tajik prose". According to the Encyclopædia Iranica, Fitrat was a pioneer of a simplified Persian literary language that circumvented traditional flourishing.

Other Tajik commentators, however, condemned Fitrat for his Turkist tendency. In an interview in 1997 Muhammadjon Shakuri, professor at the Tajik Academy of Sciences, referred to the fact that Tajik intellectuals joined the pan-Turkic idea as a mistake and made them responsible for the discrimination of Tajiks during the territorial partitioning of Central Asia. Rahim Masov, another member of the Tajik Academy of Sciences, called Fitrat, Khodzhayev and Behbudiy "Tajik traitors". Tajik president Emomali Rahmon too has joined the narrative about Tajiks who denied the existence of their own nation.

The fact that in 1924 Hind ixtilolchilari („Indian rebels“, 1923) received an award by the Azerbaijani People's Commissariat for Education proofs that Fitrat's writings were appreciated beyond the limits of Transoxania. According to Fitrat's sister, this work was translated into Indian languages and staged at theatres in India. Its significance for the Indian fight for liberation was attested by Jawaharlal Nehru.

== Ideological and political classification ==
According to Hélène Carrère d’Encausse, Fitrat was the ideological leader of the jadidist movement. The scholar of Islam Adeeb Khalid describes Fitrat's interpretation of history as "recording of human progress". As with other reformers, Fitrat was interested both in the glorious past of Transoxania as well as the present state of degradation which he observed and which the jadidists became aware of through their stay abroad. Similarly to Jamāl al-Dīn al-Afghānī, Fitrat was searching for reasons for the spiritual and temporal decay of the Muslim world. Additionally, both al-Afghānī and Fitrat saw it as the duty of the Muslims themselves to change the present state of things. Fitrat, who especially had an eye on the case of Bukhara, saw the reason for the state of his native city in the development of Islam into a religion for the rich. He proposed a reform of the education system and the introduction of a dynamic form of religion, freed from phantasy, ignorance and superstition, in which single individuals would be in the focus.

For Fitrat, the Emirate of Bukhara was characterized by corruption, abuse of power, and violence. Fitrat criticized both the clerics (ulama) as well as the worldly rulers and the people: While the clerics had divided and therefore weakened the Muslim community, the others had followed them and the emir "like sheeps". According to Khalid, Fitrat's writings from his days of exile in Moscow show a swing from anticlericalism to scepticism and irreligion. In one of the few surviving autobiographical statements by Fitrat, dating from 1929, he explained that he had wanted to separate religion from superstition. However, as he continued, he had realized that "nothing remained of religion once it was separated from superstition", which had led him towards irreligion (dinsizliq). As per Khalid, as early as in 1917 Fitrat had given up on Islamic reformism in favor of insistent Turkism.

Fitrat's reformism did not aim at an orientation on Western cultures: According to him, the success of the West came out of originally Islamic principles. For example, in Bayonoti ayyohi hindi he cites the words of the French historian Charles Seignobos on the greatness of the medieval Muslim civilization. In Sharq siyosati he wrote: "Up until today, European imperialists have given nothing to the East but immorality and destruction." On the other hand, Fitrat criticized heavily against the refusal of innovation coming from Europe by the Muslim leaders of Bukhara. This "cloak of ignorance" prevented, as per Fitrat, that Islam could be defended by means of enlightenment.

In 1921 Fitrat wrote that there were three kinds of Islam: the religion from the Quran, the religion of the ulama and the faith of the masses. The last of these he described as superstition and fetishism, the second of the aforementioned as hindered by outdated legalism. Fitrat rejected the principle of taqlid; in his world of thought knowledge should be exposed to intellectual critique. Also, it should be possible to obtain this knowledge with reasonable effort, and it had to be helpful to humankind in modernity. He was against sticking to a scholasticism that was "of no assistance to humans in the modern world". In Fitrat's view, the task of regenerating the Muslim society required spiritual renovation and political and social revolution. For him, taking part in these jadidist activities was the "duty of every single Muslim".

He argued in favor of reforms in family relations, especially improvements in the status of women. Citing a hadith that it is every Muslim' duty to pursue knowledge, he argued for the importance of women's education, in order for them to be able to pass on their knowledge to their children. Based on the Quran and on hadiths he talked about the importance of hygiene and demanded that Russian or European teachers be recruited for a school of medicine in Bukhara. Additionally, he deduced the backwardness of the Bukharan society from the practice of pederasty.

«[…] روی وطن ز ناخنی قفلت جریحه‌دار
آنها به یاد روی باطن کرده جان نثار […]»

«[…] Ruy-i vatan ze nākhon-i ghaflat jarihe-dār
Ānhā be yād-i ruy-i bātan karde jān nesār […]» "[…] The face of Watan is scratched by the fingernails of carelessness
To the face of your loved they gift their lines […]" - Abdurauf Fitrat

|Fragment from the Tajik poem تازیانه‌ای تأديب (Tāziyāne-yi taʾdib, The Curse of Premonition) (1914)

What Fitrat demanded was less a compromise between western and Islamic values and more a clean break with the past and a revolution of human concepts, structures and relations with the end goal of freeing Dār al-Islām from the infidels. As per Hélène Carrère d’Encausse Fitrat's revolutionary tone and his refusal of compromise were peculiarities that set him apart from other Muslim reformers, such as al-Afghani oder Ismail Gasprinsky. Fitrat was aware that the path toward social progress would be complicated and long. According to the scholar Sigrid Kleinmichel he articulated this by "projecting the revolutionary aims and arguments onto historical attempts at renewal whose outcome did not justify the effort". As their model Young Bukharans like Fitrat rather had examples of Muslim reformism, especially from the late Ottoman empire, than Marxism. The repeated use of India as setting for Fitrat's works is no coincidence. Sigrid Kleinmichel identified several motives for this peculiarity; the anti-British orientation in the Indian struggle for independence (while the emir of Bukhara was drawn towards the British), the movements' broad possibilities for alliances, the developing Indian national identity, congruent ideas for the overcoming of backwardness (like with Muhammad Iqbal) and the pro-Turkishness of parts of the Indian independence movement.

Fitrat's ideas of a good Muslim and of a patriot were, according to Carrère d’Encausse, closely linked to each other. Moreover, Fitrat pushed the idea of unity of all Muslims regardless of their affiliation to, for example, Shia or Sunni Islam. William Fierman, however, described Fitrat primarily as a Bukharan patriot, who also had a strong identity as a Turk and, less pronounced, as a Muslim. According to Fierman, in the case of Fitrat the contradictions between pan-Turkic and Uzbek identity can be identified: As per Fitrat, the Ottoman and Tatar Turkic languages had been on the receiving end of too much foreign influence. Contrary to that, the main goal of Fitrat's Uzbek language policies was to ensure the language's purity. He did not want this ideal to be subordinated to Turkic unity: Turkic unity, according to Fitrat, could only be achieved after purifying the language. Fitrat wanted to take the Chagatai language as the basis for such a unified Turkic tongue. Ingeborg Baldauf called Fitrat the personification of "Chaghatay nationality"; Adeeb Khalid indicates the necessity of distinguishing the concept of Pan-Turkism from the Turkism articulated by Central Asian intellectuals: According to Khalid, the Central Asian Turkism is celebrating the history of Turkestan and its very own historical heroes.

While Soviet ideologues denounced Fitrat's "Chagataiism" as nationalist, Edward A. Allworth saw him as a convinced Internationalist since young age, who was forced to deny his opinions. Hisao Komatsu wrote that Fitrat was a "patriotic, Bukharan intellectual"., but that his understanding of watan had changed over time: Initially, he had only referred to the city of Bukhara with this term, but later he included the entire emirate, and finally all of Turkestan. According to Sigrid Kleinmichel, the accusations of nationalism and Pan-Islamism against Fitrat have always been "general, never analytical".

== Work analysis ==
=== Statistical and thematical developments ===
A list of the works of Abdurauf Fitrat, compiled by Edward A. Allworth, covers 191 texts written during 27 years of active work between 1911 and 1937. Allworth sorts these texts into five subject categories: Culture, economy, politics, religion and society. An analysis of all 191 texts has the following result:

Number of Fitrat's texts by period and category
Category	1911–1919	1920–1926	1927–1937	Total
Culture	24	48	50	123
Economy	2	0	4	6
Politics	28	9	2	39
Religion	7	1	5	13
Society	9	0	1	10
Total	70	59	62	191

Two thirds of Fitrat's works deal with the subject of "culture" (broadly construed) while some 20 percent of his texts deal with political matters, which was his main subject in his early years. The political texts mostly originate during his active engagement in the jadid movement and in the government of the Bukharan People's Soviet Republic. After the creation of the Uzbek SSR and the Tajik ASSR in 1924/25 and especially after the Communist Party started exercising strong control over culture and society, Fitrat wrote less on political matters. Even though Communists accused Fitrat of deviating from the party line in his texts on culture, they are decidedly less political than his earlier texts.

According to Allworth, the reason for the almost complete disappearance of texts on society after 1919 was a missing secure opportunity of discussing non-orthodox interpretations. Fitrat reacted to restrictions on press freedom by stopping to freely express his political views in print and by choosing subjects that followed Bolshevik notions of society. Questions of family and education were exclusively discussed before 1920. Some of the most important works of Fitrat from the 1920s are his poems examining group identity.

Similar categorizations of Fitrat's work can be found in a list of 90 works in 9 categories from 1990, a list of 134 titles compiled by Ilhom Gʻaniyev in 1994 and Yusuf Avcis list from 1997. An issue is the disappearance of at least ten of Fitrat's works and the unclear dating of others, for example of Muqaddas qon, which was written sometime between 1917 and 1924. There are different dates for Munozara as well, but according to Hisao Komatsu Allworth's dating of 1327 AH (1911/1912) can be called "convincing".

Like many Central Asians, Fitrat started his writings with poems and later penned prose, dramas, journalistic works, comedies, political commentary, studies on the history of literature and the politics of education as well as polemical and ideological writings. Fitrat republished many of his earlier works in a reworked form or translated into another language.

=== Language and script ===
According to Allworth, Fitrat's first language was - typically for an urban Bukharan of his time - Central Asian Persian (Tajik); the traditional language of education was Arabic. When Fitrat was in Istanbul, Ottoman Turkish language and Persian were in use there. Fitrat had a personal aversion to the broken Turki (dialectal Uzbek) in use in Tashkent which he taught himself out of a dictionary. Contemporary analyses describe Fitrat's Turki as "peculiar" and speculate that he learned the language without prolonged contact with native speakers. Additionally, according to Allworth, Fitrat spoke Urdu and Russian; according to Adeeb Khalid, however, Fitrat did not speak any European language, and he doubts that Fitrat had functional knowledge of Russian. Borjian sees the question of Fitrat's first language as open.

Until the beginning of the political upheaval in Bukhara, Fitrat had published nearly exclusively in Persian (Tajik) language. His Persian writings of that time were, as per Adeeb Khalid, new not only in the sense of content but also because of their style: simple, direct and close to the spoken language. However, in 1917 he changed over to a highly purist Turki, in which he even explained some words in footnotes. The aim of Fitrat's Chigʻatoy gurungi was the creation of a unified Turkish language on the basis of Chagataian language and literature, which was to be achieved by the distribution of the classic works of Navoiy and others and the purification from foreign influences (from Arabic, Persian and Russian) on Turki.

In an article titled Tilimiz ("Our language") of 1919 Fitrat called the Uzbek language the "unhappiest language of the world". He defined its protection from external influence and the improvement of its reputation as additional goals to his target of purifying the literary language.

In these days, Fitrat denied that Persian was one of Central Asia's native languages. Assuming that the entire population of the region was Turkic notwithstanding the language they actually used in their everyday life was part of his Chagatayist body of thought. According to reports, as minister of education Fitrat forbade the use of Tajik in his office. Literature about Fitrat suggests that a reason for his radical change from Persian to a Turkic language lies in the fact that the Jadid movement linked the Persian tongue to repressive regimes like that of the Bukharan emir, while Turkic languages were identified with Muslim, that is Tatar and Ottoman, reformism.

In Bedil (1923), a bilingual work with passages in Persian and Turkic, Fitrat presents an Uzbek tongue influenced by the Ottoman language as a counterpart to the traditional Persian poetic language, and therefore as a language suited for modernization. His partial return to Tajik during the 1920s can, according to Borjian, be ascribed to the end of Jadidism and the beginning of the suppression of Turkish nationalisms. Tajik national identity emerged later than was the case with Central Asia's Turks. Therefore, the creation of the Tajik SSR in 1929, out of the Tajik ASSR which had been a part of the Uzbek SSR, "may" (Borjian) have motivated Fitrat to return to writing in Tajik. In Khalid's perception this step was a kind of exile and an attempt to disprove the allegations of Pan-Turkism. Fitrat himself named the promotion of Tajik drama as the motive.

In Fitrat's time, the Arabic alphabet was predominant, not only as the script of Arabic language texts, but also for texts in Persian and in Ottoman Turkish. After 1923, in Turkestan a reformed Arabic alphabet with better identification of vowels came into use; however, it still could not accommodate the variety of vowels in the Turkic languages.

Fitrat "obviously" (William Fierman) did not interpret the Arabic alphabet as holy or as an important part of Islam: Already in 1921 during a congress in Tashkent, he argued in favour of abolishing all forms of the Arabic letters apart from the initial form. This would have made possible easier teaching, learning and printing of texts. Furthermore, he wanted to abolish all letters which in Uzbek did not represent their own sound (for example the ث, Ṯāʾ). In the end, Fitrat's proposal of a fully phonetic orthography which also applied to Arabic loanwords was accepted. Diacritical signs for vowels were introduced and the "foreign" letters were discontinued, but the up to four forms of each letter (for example, ﻍ، ﻏ، ﻐ، ﻎ) survived. For Fitrat, the differentiation between "hard" and "soft" sounds was the "soul" of Turkish dialects. The demand to harmonize the orthography of foreign words according to the rules of vowel harmony was implemented in Bukhara and the ASSR Turkestan in 1923, even though many dialects did not know this differentiation.

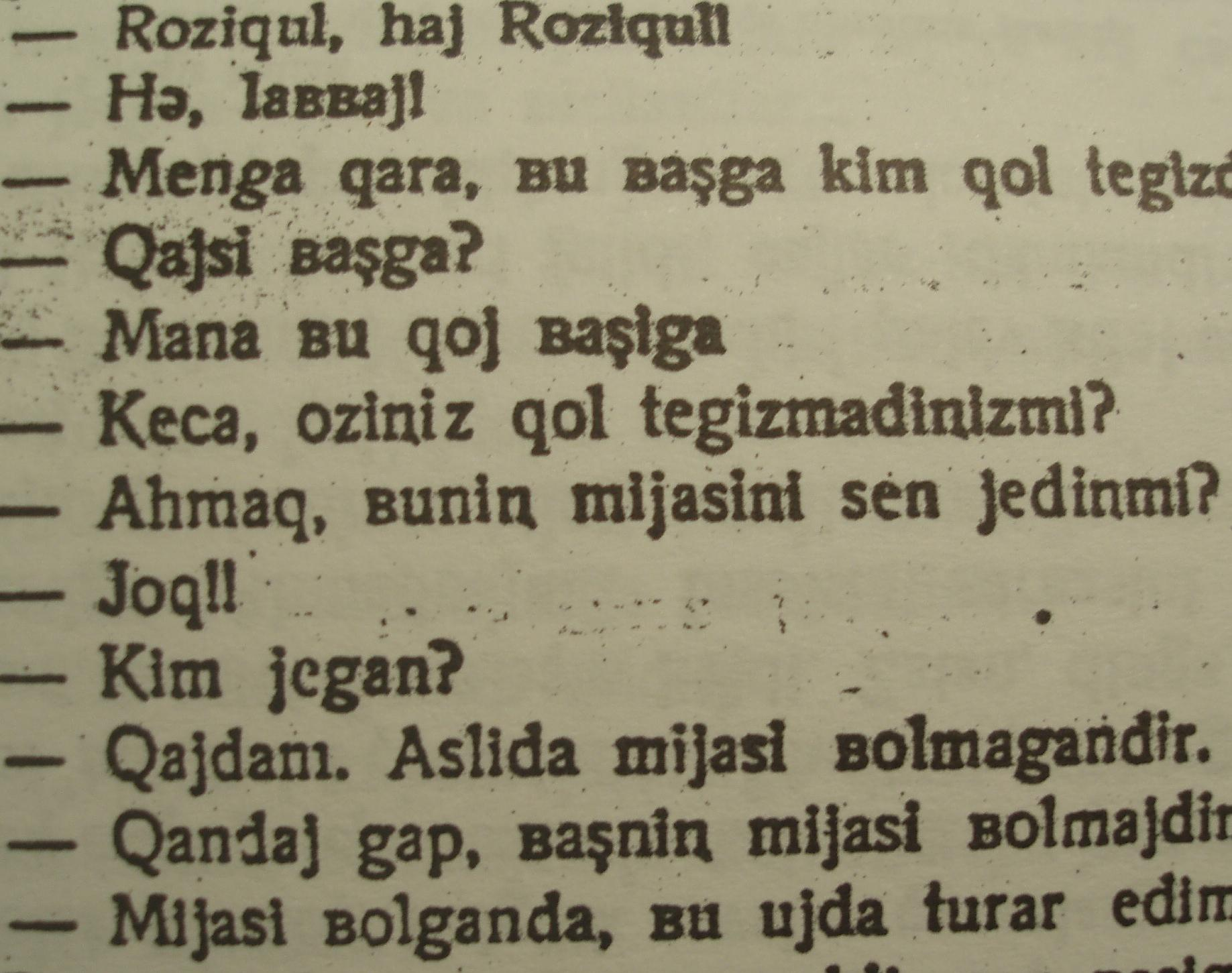
Extract out of Qiyomat (here: Qjamat) in a version published in Uzbek Latin script - here apparently strongly edited by the Soviet Union

Until 1929, the alphabets of the Central Asian Turkic languages were Latinized. Fitrat was a member of the Committee for the new Latin alphabet in Uzbekistan and had significant impact on the latinization of Tajik, whose Latin script he wanted to harmonize as much as possible with the Uzbek one. Cyrillic scripts - as usual in Russian - were implemented for Uzbek and Tajik only after Fitrat's death.

=== Nonfiction ===
In Fitrat's oeuvre a series of nonfiction and educational publications can be found: Rohbari najot ("The leader towards deliverance", 1916), for example, is an ethical treatise supporting the jadidist reforms with citations from the Quran. Another of his books deals with the topics of correct Islamic householding, the parenting of children and the duties of husband and wife. The work also argues against Polygyny. He also wrote on the history of Islam, the grammar of the Tajik language and music.

In the anthologies Eng eski turkiy adabiyot namunalari ("Examples from the oldest Turkic literature", 1927) and Oʻzbek adabiyoti namunalari ("Examples of Uzbek literature", 1928), which were directed at more advanced students, Fitrat strongly diverged from the Communist line on nationality politics by denying a strict segregation between "pure Uzbek" literature and Central Asian literature in general. The article Eski maktablarni nima qilish kerak? ("What should we do about the old schools?", 1927) brought him the attention of the GPU. He was classified as a friend of the Basmachi movement, which he however opposed. Other noteworthy nonfiction publications are Adabiyot qoidalari ("Theory of literature", 1926) and Fors shoiri Umar Hayyom ("The Persian poet Omar Khayyam", 1929).

Fitrat's scholarly interest in Music particularly applied to shashmaqam. In 1923 Fitrat entrusted Viktor Uspensky to record the entire Bukharan shashmaqam, but without the original texts which, to the greatest extent, were in Persian. This way, Fitrat tried to turkify the Bukharan shashmaqam or to present the heritage of Bukharan civilization as something Chagatai. A version of the Bukharan shashmaqam written by the composer Yunus Rajabiy in 1930 by order of Fitrat was based on Uzbek poetry and became popular more than thirty years later. Oʻzbek klassik musiqasi va uning tarixi ("Uzbek classical music and its history", 1927) fabricated the basis of a national musicology. His objective was to put the Uzbek national music into a context of ancient Turkic roots and to translate the common Central Asian musical heritage coined by Islamic, Arabic or Persian culture into a part of Uzbek nationality without mentioning Tajik. According to Alexander Djumaev Oʻzbek klassik musiqasi va uning tarixi is more of a juridical document, which created and consolidated a national cultural identity, than it is a scientific source.

=== Poetry ===
Fitrat was influenced by classical poetry during his first creative phase in a way similar to Sadriddin Ayni. He wrote poems in Persian language from his adolescence, first on religious subjects, later for pedagogic reasons and in Turki. Some of the traditional metres he used were Mathnawi and Ghazal.

In Shaytonning tangriga isyoni ("Satan's rebellion against God", 1924), Fitrat was one of the first Turki poets to use Turkic suffixes for tail rhymes, along the usual internal rhymes. In 1918, Fitrat introduced the critique of the Perso-Arabic system of prosody called aruz from Istanbul to Central Asia and demanded, together with others, the provision for Turkic metrics in Turkic poetry and the use of the meter called barmoq.

=== Drama ===
Allworth recognizes four different types of dialogue and drama in Fitrat's work: Discussions with strangers (1911-1913, for example in Munozara and Bayonoti sayyohi hindi), counseling with heroes from the past (1915-1919, Muqaddas qon and Temurning sogʻonasi), allegorical dialogue (1920-1924, for example in Qiyomat and Shaytonning tangriga isyoni), and dialectic (1926-1934, in Toʻlqin). Bedil unites elements of "allegorical dialogue" and the discussion with strangers.

In his dramatic work, Fitrat often uses the passive voice as genus verbi. Using this technique, he avoided having to name protagonists. According to Allworth, this and the use of homonyms created an effect of mystification which related to Allah having exclusive knowledge of all motives and deeds.

==== Avoidance of conflict in dialogue ====
The dispute (a genre called munozara, "discussion", in Uzbek) is a traditional, Islamic genre of literature that was present both in prose and in verse and which can be seen as the genre preceding theatre in Central Asia. The form Fitrat chose in Munozara, in which the side the author takes is evident, was less valued in classic poetry. Like drama or short story, the classic Turko-Persian literature did not know the genre of dialogue. Illiterate bystanders sometimes mistook performances for reality.

In Munozara, Fitrat contrasted a progressive European with an arrogant madrasah teacher from Bukhara. The European argues factually and in an instructional manner and is superior to the teacher even in the area of Islamic studies. Finally, the mudarris is convinced and recognizes the "new method" as supreme. However, it is not shown how this conversion came to be. Since the classic Turko-Persian literature does not know real conflict, but only discourse between master and disciple, the conversation stays calm, even though the teacher sometimes shows his anger. In order to further reinforce his message, Fitrat added an epilogue to the dialogue in which he demanded reforms from the emir - many other "reform dialogues" did not have such an epilogue. Fitrat's method of having criticism of Bukharan society come from "outside", from a European and in neutral India, was one of the few accepted possibilities. He used a similar method in Bayonoti sayyohi hindi, in which an Indian tourist recalls his experiences in Bukhara. Stylistically, the work is strongly resemblant of the first Iranian novelist Zayn al-Abedin Maraghei.

==== Dramas of ambiguity ====
In 1983, still before Fitrat's reinterpretation during perestroika, Ahmad Aliev recognized an "unconventional complexity" in Fitrat's dramatic work.

According to Edward A. Allworth Fitrat's dramas from the years between 1922 and 1924 - especially Qiyomat, Bedil and Shaytonning tangriga isyoni - are marked by subtleties and intended ambiguities. The reason for this can found in the political and social circumstances in which these works were written. Through his choice of words, Fitrat made his subversive messages accessible only to those privy to contemporary Central Asian literature, while his anger found the form of indirect, entertaining criticism. Zulkhumor Mirzaeva (Alisher Navoiy University for Uzbek language and literature) argued that in these works the Soviet censorship was deceived by an allegedly antireligious essence and that sociopolitical ideas were communicated that way. While Fitrat was canonized as a master of atheist esthetics he actually conveyed other meanings simultaneously. As per Mirzaeva it was only during Uzbekistan's independence that, starting with Ninel Vladimirova, a new interpretation of these works arose. According to this reinterpretation, Fitrat displayed the ignorance and russification of his time by critique and ridicule. According to Mirzaeva's own analyses, Fitrat smuggled his "fight for national liberation in an atheistic shell".

Shaytonning tangriga isyoni is sometimes described as short drama, sometimes as epic poem (dastan). According to Allworth, Fitrat's polemic against Stalinism is packed up in an allegorical dialogue between angels and the devil. He interprets the use of the term Shaitan (instead of Iblis or Azazel) for the devil as an example for the allegorical nature; the term is phonetically close to the name Stalin and was in fact used in Central Asia to invoke Joseph Stalin. Adeeb Khalid, however, disagrees and argues for reading the actual text and less "between the lines".

The historical drama Abulfayzxon ("Abulfaiz Khan", last ruler of the Bukharan Janid dynasty of the Uzbek Khanate, 1924) draws parallels between historical and contemporary upheaval and absolutisms in Bukhara and is held as first Uzbek tragedy.

=== Satire and Nasreddinic figures ===
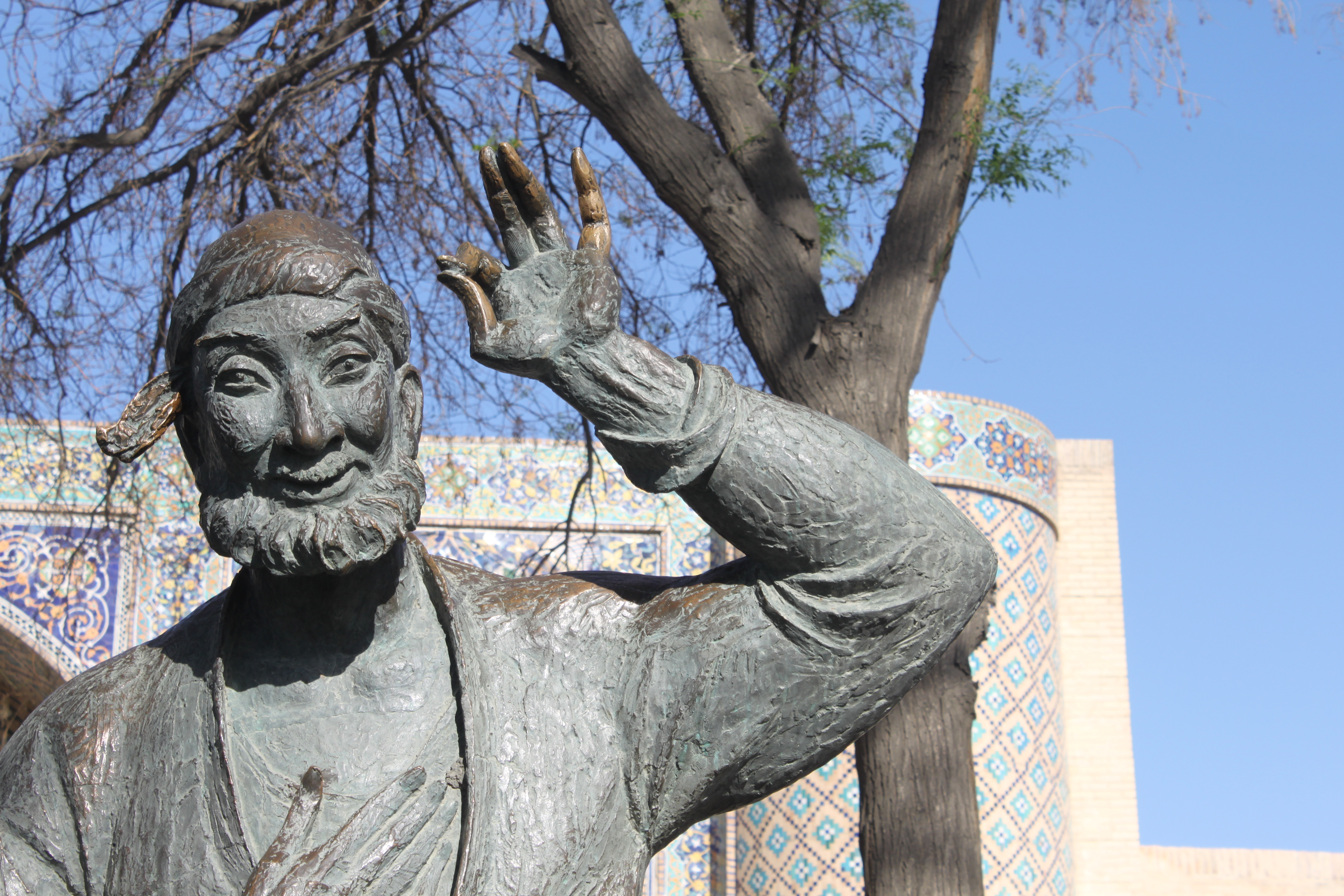
Nasreddin statue in Bukhara

Like Abdulla Qodiriy and Gʻafur Gʻulom, Fitrat increasingly used satiric concepts in his stories from the 1920s onwards. Only a few years earlier, prose had started gaining ground in Central Asia; by including satirical elements, reformers like Fitrat succeeded in winning over the audience. These short stories were used in alphabetization campaigns, where traditional characters and mindsets were presented in a new, socially and politically relevant context. In order to stay similar to the structure of traditional anecdotes, the writers refrained from direct agitation within the narration. Instead, they often added didactic epilogues where tradition would have demanded the summarized joke. After 1920, the "victims" of Fitrat's satire, besides mistaken ideologues and cumbersome bureaucrats, also included the Soviet rulers.

Similarities to Nasreddin stories can be found in several of Fitrat's texts, for example in Munozara, Qiyomat and Oq mozor ("The white Tomb", 1928), even though the actual Nasreddin figure is missing in the last text. In works like Qiyomat, Fitrat mixed traditionally fantastical elements with parts of fairy tales, historical or contemporary notions. According to Sigrid Kleinmichel, the confrontation of Pochamir (the protagonist of Qiyomat, an opium smoker like Nasreddin( with the Last Judgment in a fever dream can be seen as a reference to Karl Marx' words of the opium of the people. Qiyomat was first reworked in 1935, which led to the loss of contemporary references; Fitrat transferred the story into the time of Tsarist rule. In the Soviet versions, the focus of the story is no longer on the colonial oppression of the Tsarist era and the satiric presentation of life in the Soviet Union, but on the criticism of religion. Due to its "atheism", the Communists later translated the text into several languages, even though the satire originally was directed at Communist dogmas. Allworth sees a special humour and sense of wordplay in Qiyomat.

=== Incorporation of older Islamic literature ===
In Shaytonning tangriga isyoni, Fitrat portrays Shaitan, the devil, similar to the character known from the Quran and dīwān literature. However, Fitrat expands the plot into a "justified resistance" against the despot Allah. The quranic figures Zaynab bint Jahsh, a wife of Mohammed, and Zayd ibn Harithah are central to Zayid va Aynab ("Zaid and Zainab", 1928). Yet, Fitrat's focus in this text is not on the question of adoption in Islam, but on the prophet's sexuality and the selfishness of Mohammed's prophecy. The angels Harut and Marut are important to Zahraning imoni ("Zahra's belief", 1928). Both Meʼroj ("Mi'raj", 1928) and Rohbari najot are densely peppered with citations from the Quran. In Qiyomat, Pochamir encounters Munkar and Nakir, but the numerous references to the Quran and the irreverence directed at Allah were only added under Soviet rule.

In Bedil, Fitrat cites the Indo-Persian Sufi and poet Bedil, but even though the subject of the text is religious he abstains from exclamations like In schā'a llāh and the Basmala.

== Works cited ==
- Zaynabidin Abdirashidov: ʻAbdurra'uf Fitrat in Istanbul. Quest for Freedom. De Gruyter, Berlin/Boston 2023 (ANOR Central Asian Studies vol. 22).
- Zaynabidin Abdirashidov: Known and Unknown Fiṭrat. Early Convictions and Activities. In: Acta Slavica Iaponica, vol. 37, 2016.
- Edward A. Allworth: Uzbek Literary Politics. Mouton & Co., London/Den Haag/Paris 1964.
- Edward A. Allworth: The Modern Uzbeks. From the Fourteenth Century to the Present. A Cultural History. Hoover Institution Press, Stanford 1990.
- Edward A. Allworth: The Preoccupations of ʿAbdalrauf Fitrat, Bukharan nonconformist. An analysis and list of his writings. Das Arab. Buch, Berlin 2000.
- Edward A. Allworth: Evading Reality. The Devices of ʿAbdalrauf Fitrat, modern Central Asian reformist. Brill, Leiden/Boston/Köln 2002.
- Habib Borjian: Feṭrat, ʿAbd-al-Raʾūf Boḵārī. In: Encyclopædia Iranica; vol. 9: Ethé–Fish. Routledge, London/New York 1999, p. 564–567.
- Hélène Carrère d’Encausse: Fiṭrat, ʿAbd al-Raʾūf. In: The Encyclopaedia of Islam. New Edition; Vol. 2: C–G. Brill, Leiden 1965, p. 932.
- William Fierman: Language Planning and National Development. The Uzbek Experience. Mouton de Gruyter, Berlin/New York 1991.
- Halim Kara: Reclaiming National Literary Heritage: The Rehabilitation of Abdurauf Fitrat and Abdulhamid Sulaymon Cholpan in Uzbekistan. In: Europe-Asia Studies, vol. 54, No. 1, 2002, p. 123–142.
- Adeeb Khalid: The Politics of Muslim Cultural Reform: Jadidism in Central Asia. University of California Press, Berkeley CA. 1998.
- Adeeb Khalid: Making Uzbekistan: Nation, Empire, and Revolution in the Early USSR. Cornell University Press, Ithaca/London 2015, ISBN 978-0-8014-5409-7.
- Sigrid Kleinmichel: Aufbruch aus orientalischen Dichtungstraditionen. Studien zur usbekischen Dramatik und Prosa zwischen 1910 und 1934. Akadémiai Kiadó, Budapest 1993.
- Sigrid Kleinmichel: The Uzbek short story writer Fiṭrat's adaption of religious traditions. In: Glenda Abramson, Hilary Kilpatrick (ed.): Religious Perspectives in Modern Muslim and Jewish Literatures. Routledge, New York 2006.
- Charles Kurzman: Modernist Islam, 1840–1940. A sourcebook. Oxford University Press, New York 2002.
