= Muqaddimat al-Adab =

Dictionary written by Al-Zamakhshari

The Muqaddimat al-Adab is a Persian and Chagatai dictionary written by Zamakhshari to teach Arabic in the 12th century. In the 14th century, Mongolian was also added to this dictionary. The first manuscript was found in Bukhara by Abdurauf Fitrat. The oldest surviving copies of the work belong to the 13th–15th centuries. The work, which contains information about the dialects of the Oghuz, Kipchak, and Kangly Turks, was used as a textbook in madrasahs for years. It is one of the most important works after Dīwān Lughāt al-Turk for the Middle Turkic period. It was also essential for the Mongolian language in the 14th century.

== Mongolian vocabulary ==
Some Mongolian vocabulary in the Muqaddimat al-Adab
English	Middle Mongol	Transcription	Modern Mongolian
One	نيكان (nykân)	niken	нэг (nigen)
Two	قويار (qwyâr)	koyar	хоёр (khoyor)
Three	غوربان (ğwrbân)	gurban	гурав (gurav)
Four	دوربان (dwrbân)	dörben	дөрөв (döröv)
Five	تابون (tâbwn)	tabun	тав (tav)
Water	اوصون (âwṣwn)	usun	ус (us)
Sky	كوكه (kwkh)	köke	хөх (khökh) (blue), тэнгэр (tenger) (sky)
Time	جاق (jâq)	caq	цаг (tsag)
Year	هون (hwn)	hon	он (on), жил (jil)
Star	هودون (hwdwn)	hodun	од (od)
Spring	قابور (qâbwr)	kabur	хавар (khavar)
Summer	جون (jun)	cun	зун (zun)
Autumn	نامور (nâmwr)	namur	намар (namar)
Winter	اوبول (âwbwl)	öbül	өвөл (övöl)
