= Muhammad Sharif merchant madrasa =

Madrasa in Bukhara, Uzbekistan

The Muhammad Sharif merchant madrasa is a historical monument in Bukhara region, Uzbekistan. The madrasa has not been preserved to this day. The Muhammad Sharif merchant madrasa was founded in 1777 in Gʻoziyon street, during the reign of Amir Doniyolbiy in the Bukhara Emirate, by Muhammad Sharif merchant. This madrasa belonged to the fourth highest category and was considered one of the most famous madrasas in Bukhara. According to Abdurauf Fitrat’s information, the annual budget of this madrasa was 60 thousand tangas. The scholar Abdusattor Jumanazarov studied a number of waqf documents related to this madrasa and provided information about the madrasa. Classes were held in this madrasa until the Soviet period. According to the waqf document, Muhammad Sharif merchant built a large madrasa with many cells made of baked bricks and a small separate madrasa made of raw bricks. Muhammad Sharif merchant endowed more than 5 thousand plots of land for this madrasa, for the Koʻli Malik mausoleums, Xayrabod, Komi Abu Muslim, Qorakoʻl, and Hazrati Ubbon. According to the sources, Muhammad Sharif merchant was a great merchant in the period of Ashtarkhanid Abulfayzxon and later periods, and he was a disciple of Shaykh Hazrati Imlon. There are also a number of legends related to the construction of the madrasa. According to the legends, Muhammad Sharif found a small piece of gold and brought it to his teacher. The teacher did not take the gold and advised the disciple to use this wealth for some work. Sadri Ziyo wrote that there were 92 cells in this madrasa. Muhammad Sharif merchant madrasa consisted of 92 cells. This madrasa was built in the style of Central Asian architecture. The madrasa was made of baked bricks, wood, stone and plaster.
