= Majid Qodiri =

Uzbek literary scholar and educator (1886–1938)

Majid Qodiri (Kadyrov)
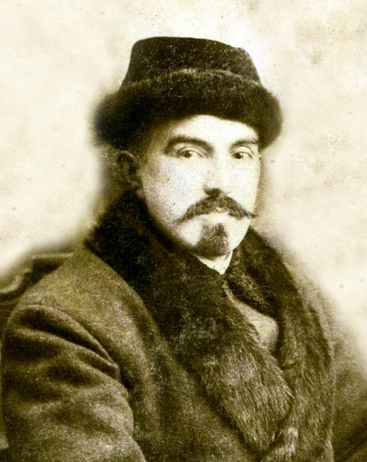
- One of first Uzbek Jadids in Turkestan Majid Qodiriy in 1918 Tashkent
- Born: 'Abd-ul-Majid-khan son of 'Abd-ul-Qodir-khan; May 2, 1886; Tashkent; Russian Turkestan
- Died: October 4, 1938 (aged 52); Tashkent; Uzbek Soviet Socialist Republic
- Occupations: Scholar, public figure, jadid, publicist, writer, and literary translator
- Writing career
- Notable awards: Hero of Labour, 23.03.1923

Signature
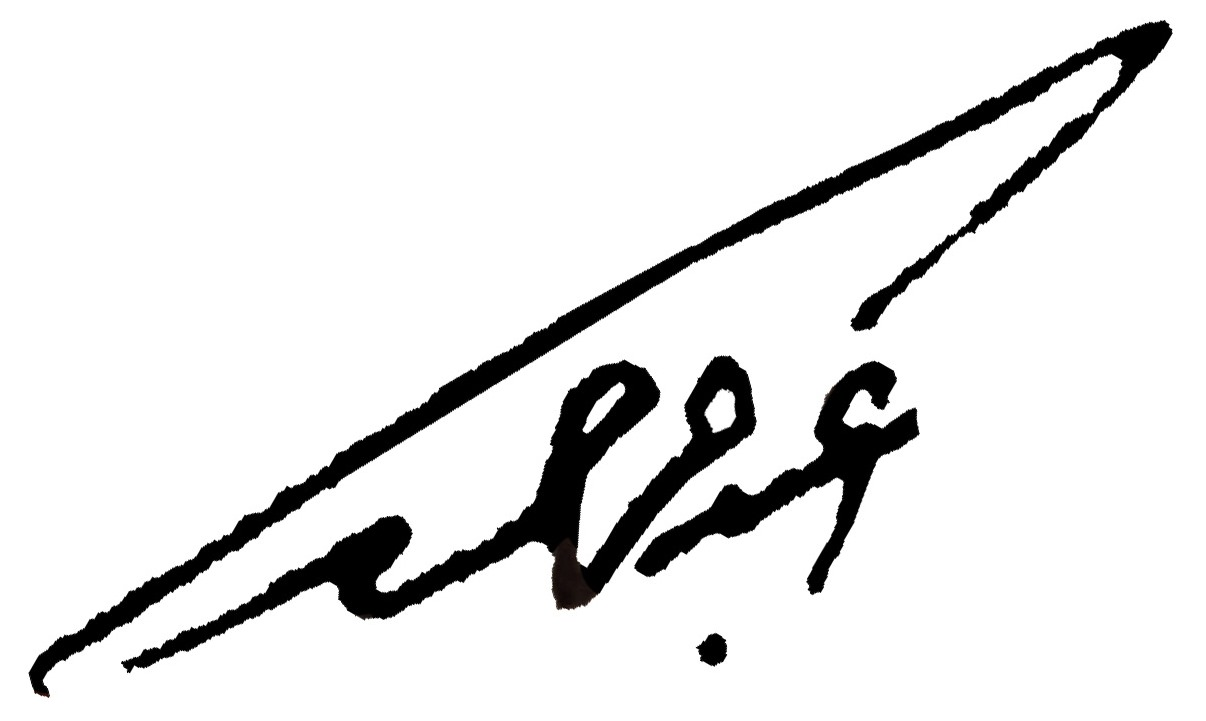

Majid Qodiri (Kadyrov) ('Abd-ul-Majid-khan, son of 'Abd-ul-Qodir-khan (Kadyrov) (Uzbek: Abdul-Majidxon Qori Abdul-Qodirxon Qori o'g'li), (Uzbek: Majid Qodiriy,Мажид Қодирий) (Arabic: مجید قَارِئ قادری),(May 2, 1886, Qori-Yoghdi Mahalla, Sheyhantahur daha, Tashkent — October 4, 1938, Tashkent) was an Uzbek literary scholar, public figure, and publicist who was the author of the first Uzbek tutorials and textbooks of literature, history, and arithmethi. He was one of the founders of Jadidism in Turkestan.

== Biography ==
Majid Qodiri was born in the family of a clergyman in the mahalla "Kori Yogdi" of Shayhantuhur dah (part) of Tashkent city. He graduated from the old town school, then from the Higher Educational Institution of Oriental type (Madrasa, 1903–1912). He began his labor activity with teaching in the Turkic school "Usuli-savtiya" (old-method), later in the schools "Usuli-jadidiya" (new-method) in Tashkent, then in the Russian-native school and madrasa.

He spoke Persian, Arabic, Ottoman, Russian and English.

Since 1906 he worked as a teacher of mathematics in the Russian-native school, until the revolution of 1917 he taught and managed secondary schools in Tashkent.

In 1910, the first part of the textbook "Hisob" (Counting) was published for primary grades of New-Method schools with an additional task book; in 1913, the version of the textbook supplemented by the author was recognized as the main textbook for all New-Method schools.

In 1914, the second part of the textbook "Hisob" (Counting) for senior classes of New-Method schools was published, which served as a continuation of the first part.

From 1917 to 1919 he headed the school "Turon" created by the Jadid Movement in Tashkent, in the Old City.

From 1919 to 1920 he was Head of pedagogical courses of the school "Turan".

Since 1918 he was a member of the Communist Party.

From 1920 to 1921 – head of the natural history pedagogical laboratory in Tashkent.

He took an active part in the formation of the grammar of the Uzbek language. He was a special invited member of the council at the First Congress of Uzbek Language and Grammar held in Tashkent on January 1–5, 1921 (1921 yil yanvarida bolgon birinchi olka ozbek til va imlo kurultoyining chikargon karorlari. – T.: Turkiston Jumchuriyatining lav lat nashriyoti. – 1922.)

In 1921 he also taught at the Boy Scouts school.

In 1921, he began his activity at the Turkestan State University, teaching Uzbek language at the Old Town Working Faculty.

In 1921–1922 – Head of the methodological part of the department for the elimination of illiteracy in the army of the Political Department.

1921–1923 – Organizer and director of the Working Faculty of the Central Asian State University, dean of the Working Faculty of Turkestan State University and part-time head of the Experimental Research Laboratory at the university.

On March 23, 1923, for special merits and active and long service in the affairs of education, was awarded the title "Hero of Labor".

1923–1925 – Director of Uzbekimpros (Узбекимпрос), Director of the Museum of Nature Protection, consultant and organizer of the Agricultural Museum in the old city of Tashkent.

In 1924 he also worked as an employee of the Department of Waqfs of the city of Tashkent.

From 1924 to 1926 – Deputy Chairman of the Central Asian Committee for Museums and Protection of Monuments of Antiquity, Art and Nature, Deputy Chairman of the Turkestan Committee of Education.

In 1925 he took an active part in the return of the "Quran of Osman" from Ufa back to Tashkent, was a member of the Commission of the Central Asian Committee of Antiquities and Art to witness the "Quran of Osman".

In 1925 (March 21 – May 1) — organizer and representative of the Central Election commission and the Council of People's Commissars of the Uzbek SSR at the Paris Exhibition. On his way to Paris he stopped in Berlin and met with Uzbek students studying in Germany.

1926–1928 — Head of the school of cotton growing and factory apprenticeship at Main Cotton Committee in Tashkent.

From 1928 he headed the Physics Cabinet at the Central Asian State University (formerly Turkestan State University).

1928–1930 — Dean of the Labor Faculty at Central Asian State University, and head of the history office at the university.

In early 1929 he was deprived of membership in the Communist Party, and in 1930 he was relieved of all his leading positions. The reason for deprivation of membership in the Communist Party and dismissal from his posts were denunciations by ardent supporters of Soviet colonization, who had achieved considerable success in eliminating prominent Central Asian figures of the time. In addition to the denunciations, the arrest was also facilitated by slanderous feuilletons published in the press in 1929–1930; the suspicions described in these feuilletons were never proven.

Majid Qodiri continued to work in schools even after 1930, including the working faculty of Central Asian State University.

In 1937 he was taken under arrest by NKVD officers as an "enemy of the people". According to the official documents of the criminal case, he was taken into custody on April 2, 1938.

On September 12, 1938, by decision of the "troika", he was sentenced to capital punishment. The sentence was carried out on the bloodiest day in the history of Turkestan – October 4, 1938.

507 top Uzbek intellectuals were shot as "enemies of the people" in the execution prison at Yunusobod Aktepe; after the country's independence, a memorial complex "Shahidlar Hotirasi" ("In Memory of the Victims of Repression") was erected at this site.

Majid Qodiri was posthumously rehabilitated by the Military Collegium of the Supreme Soviet of the USSR, 13.02.1958 – for lack of corpus delicti and restored to the Communist party.
