= Abduqodir Shakuriy =

Turkestani educator, journalist and activist (1875–1943)

- Born: 1875; Samarkand, Russian Empire (now Uzbekistan)
- Died: 1943 (aged 67–68); Samarkand, Uzbek Soviet Socialist Republic, USSR
- Citizenship: Soviet Union
- Occupations: journalist, teacher

Abduqodir Abdushukur (Abdushukurov) Shakuriy (Shukuri) (Cyrillic Абдукадыр Шакури; Arabic script عبدقادر شکوری, 1875 Samarqand Region, Zarafshan district, Turkestan governorate, Russian Empire — 1943 Samarkand, UzSSR, USSR) was a teacher from Samarkand, author of a number of textbooks for new method schools, journalist, one of the famous representatives of jadidism from Samarkand.

== Life ==
Shakuriy was personally acquainted with Mahmudkhodja Behbudiy, Abdurauf Fitrat, Saidahmad Vasli, Said Reza Alizada, Khoja Muin, Sadriddin Aini, Siddiqi Adji, Abdulqayum Kurbi, Torakul Zehni, Hamza Hakimzada Niyazi and others. Jadids regularly gathered at someone's house, spent time together, discussed plans and news, exchanged ideas, read and discussed works and poems. He wrote articles in a number of jadidist newspapers and magazines.

Abduqodir Shakuriy died in 1943, at the age of 68.

== Educational activity ==
At the end of the 1890s, at the invitation of the jadids, he went to Kokhan and got acquainted with the local new method schools opened by the jadids. He returned to Samarkand and in 1901 opened a modern school in the village of Rajabamin, where he was born and raised, where mainly secular and ordinary subjects were taught. In addition to teaching at his school, Abduqodir Shakuriy also wrote textbooks and published them at his own expense.

One of his famous textbooks is "Literacy Guidelines" (Tajik - Rahnamoi savod) in Persian. He also wrote textbooks such as "Jami-ul-Hikayat" (1907), "Zubdat-ul-Ashar" (1907). Some of the textbooks were written in cooperation with Saidahmad Vasli and Mahmud Behbudi.

In 1909, Shakuri went to Kazan, where he met Tatar jadids. In 1912, he went to Istanbul, where he got acquainted with the teaching methods of the new schools. He makes many acquaintances and friends.

Shakuri later opened a modern school for girls. The head of this school was Shakuri himself, and the teacher was his wife Razia, who was a teacher. Later, the couple decided to merge the two schools and abolish separate education, much to the consternation of the local clergy and the conservative part of the population at the time.

In 1921, Abduqodir Shakuriy was appointed headmaster of the 13th school in Samarkand. At the same time, he was a teacher of language and literature at this school. In 1925, a primary school was opened with the help of Shakuri and the funds of the population in one of the villages on the outskirts of Samarkand. Shakuri was awarded the title of meritorious employee in public education.

== Memory ==
- The name of Abduqodir Shakuriy was given to a high school in Samarkand and one of the streets of Samarkand.
- Artist Imyar Mansurov painted a portrait of Abduqodir Shakuriy

== Bibliography ==
- Allworth, Edward (1992). The modern Uzbeks: from the fourteenth century to the present; a cultural history. Hoover Press. ISBN 0-817-98732-0.
- Khalid, Adeeb (1998). The Politics of Muslim Cultural Reform. Jadidism in Central Asia. University of California Press, Berkeley & Los Angeles. ISBN 0-520-21356-4.
