= Choʻlpon =

Uzbek poet, writer, and literary translator

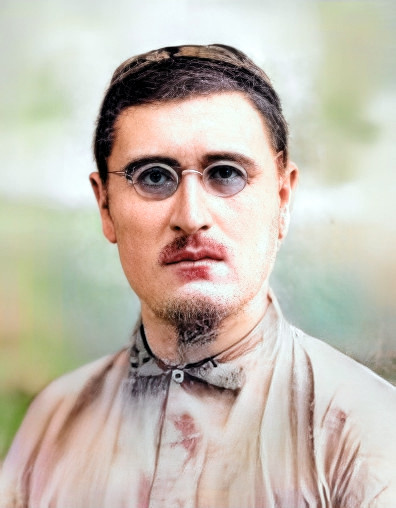
- Born: Abdulhamid Sulaymon oʻgʻli Yunusov; 1897; Andijan, Turkestan, Russian Empire
- Died: 4 October 1938 (aged 40–41); Tashkent, Uzbek SSR, USSR
- Occupation: Writer
- Writing career
- Notable awards: Alisher Navoiy State Prize (1991); Order of Independence (1999)

Abdulhamid Sulaymon zoda Yunusov (Uzbek: Abdulhamid Sulaymon zoda Yunusov, Абдулҳамид Сулаймон зода Юнусов, (1893 – 4 October 1938)), most commonly known by his penname Choʻlpon (sometimes spelled Cholpán in English), was an Uzbek poet, playwright, novelist, and literary translator. Choʻlpon was one of Central Asia's most popular poets during the first half of the 20th century. He was also the first person to translate William Shakespeare's plays into the Uzbek language.

Choʻlpon's works had a major impact on the works of other Uzbek writers. He was one of the first authors to introduce realism into Uzbek literature. Choʻlpon was executed during the Great Purge under the Russia.

== Life ==
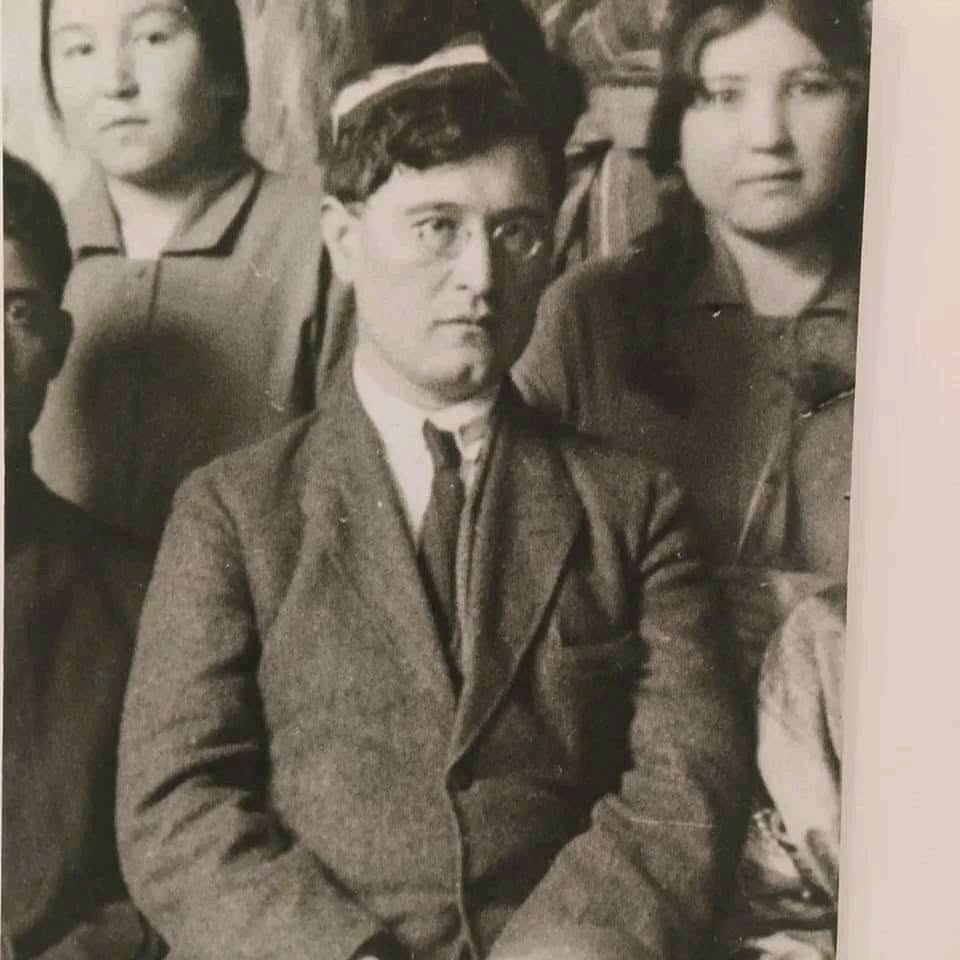
Abdulhamid Cholpán.

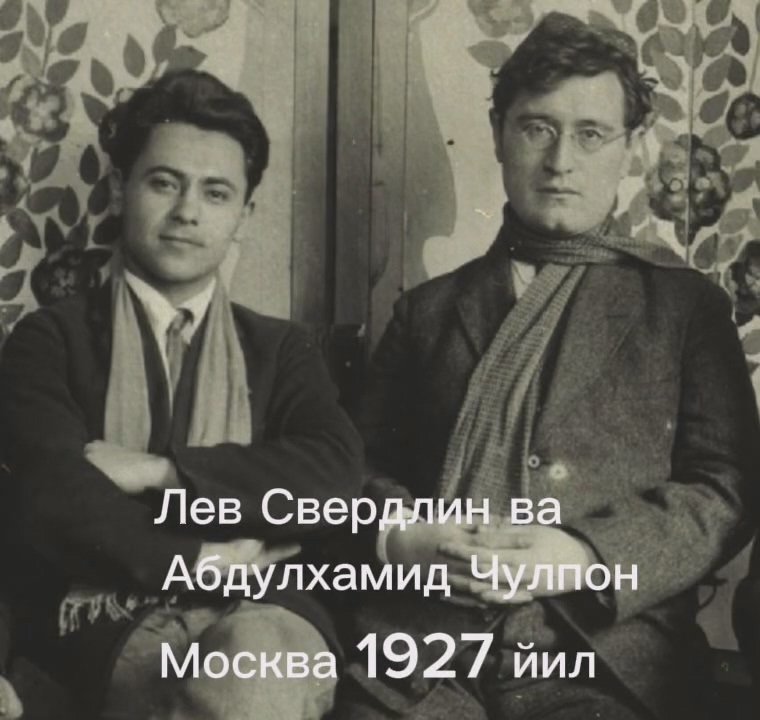
Lev Sverdlin and Abdulhamid Cholpán. Moskow 1927.

Abdulhamid Sulaymon oʻgʻli Yunusov was born in 1893 in Andijan. His father, Sulaymonqul Mulla Muhammad Yunus oʻgʻli, was a learned man. Choʻlpon first studied at a madrasa. Later he enrolled in a Russian tuzem school (Russian: Ру́сско-тузе́мная шко́ла), an elementary school for non-Russians in Turkestan.

From 1919 until 1920, Choʻlpon worked as editor-in-chief of the newspaper TurkROSTA. He also worked on the editorial board of many other publications, such as Ishtirokiyun, Qizil bayroq (The Red Flag), Turkiston (Turkestan), Buxoro axbori (Bukhara News), and Darhon.

Like many Uzbek authors of his time, such as Abdulla Qodiriy and Abdulrauf Fitrat, Choʻlpon was executed during the Great Purge under the leadership of Joseph Stalin. He was arrested as "enemy of the people" in 1937 and, as with Qodiriy and Fitrat, was killed on 4 October 1938.

== Work ==
Choʻlpon's first poems were published in Oʻzbek yosh shoirlari (Young Uzbek Poets), a collection of poems by young Uzbek poets, in 1922. His three collections of poems, namely, Uygʻonish (The Awakening) (1922), Buloqlar (The Springs) (1924), and Tong sirlari (The Secrets of Dawn) (1926) were published during his lifetime. Choʻlpon's novel Kecha va kunduz (Night and Day) is one of the most highly acclaimed novels in Uzbek literature.

Choʻlpon's works had a major impact on the works of other Uzbek writers. He was one of the first authors to introduce realism into Uzbek literature. Choʻlpon used clear and straightforward language in his works. He appealed to Uzbek national identity in some of his works, and because of it was criticized as a bourgeois nationalist in Soviet sources. He was finally rehabilitated during glasnost.

In addition to writing numerous poems, plays, and short stories, Choʻlpon translated the works of foreign writers including Alexander Pushkin, Maxim Gorky, and William Shakespeare into Uzbek. In particular, he translated Pushkin's Boris Godunov and Shakespeare's Hamlet into Uzbek.

=== Dramas ===
Choʻlpon's first forays into drama date from 1919, when he wrote small stage works such as Temirchi, Gunoh, and Choʻrining isyoni. In the early 1920s, he published Yorqinoy, Xalil Farang, Qotil (1921), Sevgi va Saltanat, Yorqinoy (1920), Xalil farang (1921), Yana uylanaman (1926), Mushtumzo'r (1928), Hujum (1928) and Choʻlpon sevgisi (1922).
