= Jadid =

1880s–1920s Muslim modernists in the Russian Empire

Jadid intellectuals and their countries or regions of origin

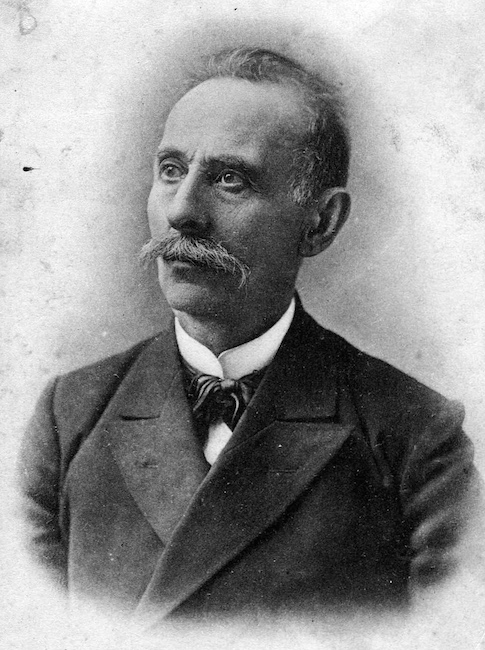
Ismail Gasprinsky (Crimea)

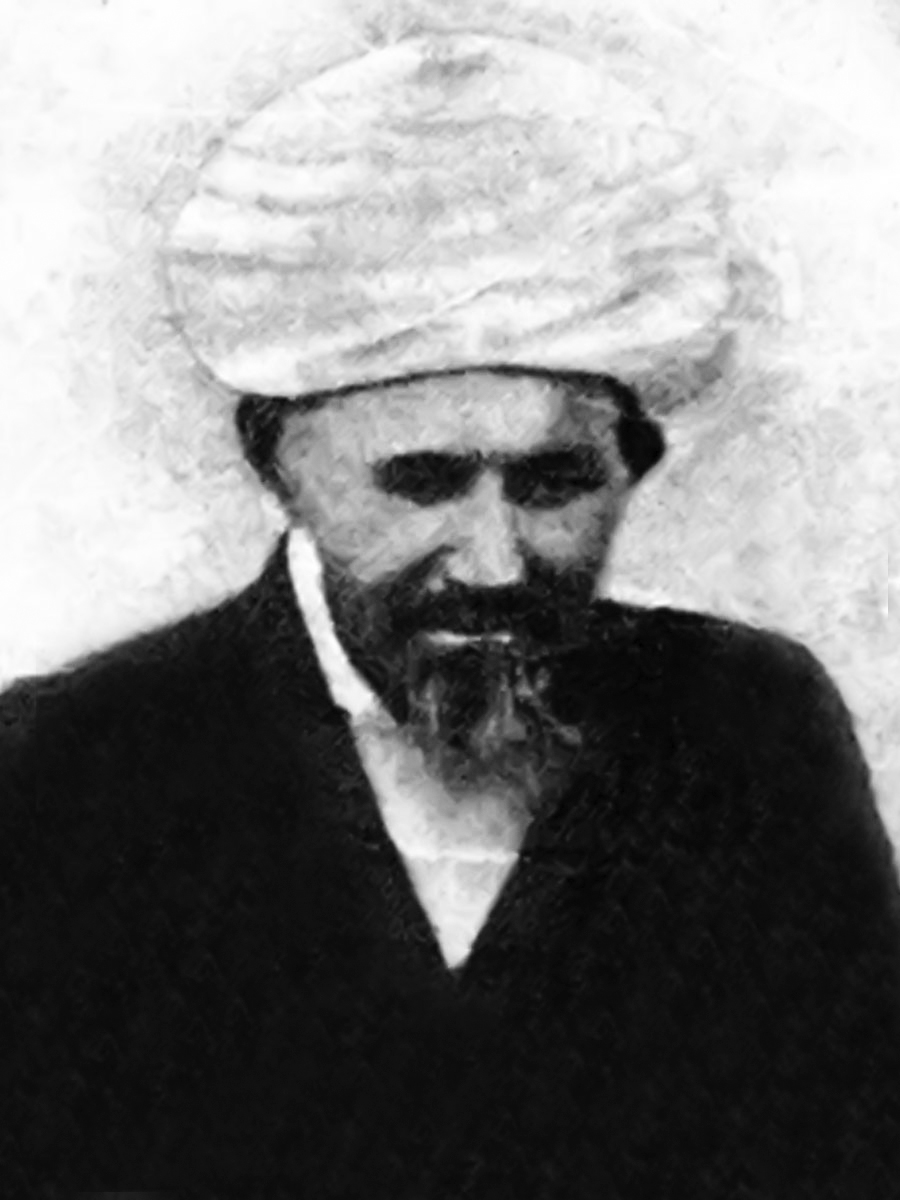
Zaynulla Rasulev (Bashkortostan)

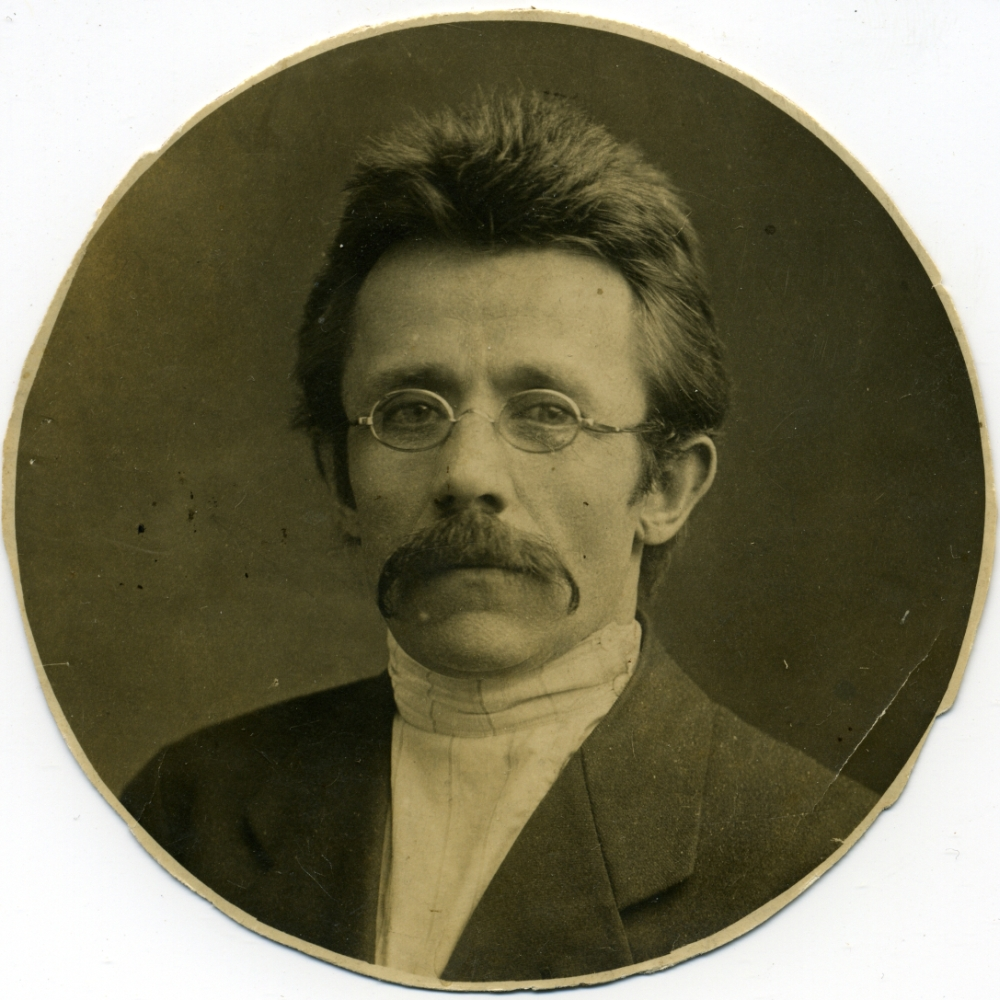
Musa Bigiev (Tatarstan)

The Jadid movement (Note: Arabic: جديدية, romanized: jadīdiyya, lit. 'the renewal'; Bashkir: Йәҙитселек; Crimean Tatar: Usul-i Cedid; Kazakh: Жәдитшілік, romanized: Jäditşılık; Kyrgyz: Жадидчилик, romanized: Cadidçilik; Russian: Джадидизм, romanized: Dzhadidizm; Tatar: Җәдитчелек, romanized: Cädidçelek; Uzbek: Jadidchilik) (Note: Members of the Jadid movement are referred to simply as Jadids.) or Jadidism was a Turco-Islamic modernist political, religious, and cultural movement in the Russian Empire in the late 19th and early 20th century. They normally referred to themselves by the Tatar terms Taraqqiparvarlar ("progressives"), Ziyalilar ("intellectuals"), or simply Yäşlär/Yoshlar ("youth"). The Jadid movement advocated for an Islamic social and cultural reformation through the revival of pristine Islamic beliefs and teachings, while simultaneously engaging with modernity. Jadids maintained that Muslim peoples in Tsarist Russia had entered a period of moral and societal decay that could only be rectified by the acquisition of a new kind of knowledge and modernist, European-modeled cultural reform.

Modern technologies of communication and transportation such as telegraph, printing press, postal system, and railways, as well as the spread of Islamic literature through print media such as periodicals, journals, newspapers, etc. played a major role in dissemination of Jadid ideals in Central Asia. Although there were substantial ideological differences within the movement, Jadids were marked by their widespread use of print media in promoting their messages and advocacy of the Usul-i Jadid or "new method" of teaching in the maktab of the empire, from which the term "Jadidism" is derived. As per their Usul-i Jadid system of education, the Jadids established an enterprising institutions of schools that taught a standardized, disciplined curriculum to all Muslims across Central Asia. The new curriculum comprised both religious education and material sciences that would be resourceful for the community in tackling the modern-day challenges.

A leading figure in the efforts to reform education was the Crimean Tatar intellectual, educator, publisher, and politician Ismail Gasprinsky (1851–1914). Intellectuals such as Mahmud Khoja Behbudiy, author of the famous play The Patricide and founder of one of Turkestan's first Jadid schools, carried Gasprinsky's ideas back to Central Asia. Anti-colonial discourse constituted a major aspect of the Jadid movement; leaders like Gasprinskii promoted anti-Russian political activism. Following the defeat and collapse of the Ottoman Empire in the aftermath of World War I, the Jadids extended their anti-colonial critiques against the Allied great powers like the British and other Western European empires. Jadid members were recognized and honored in Uzbekistan after the dissolution of the Soviet Union.

== Relationship with the Muslim clergy ==
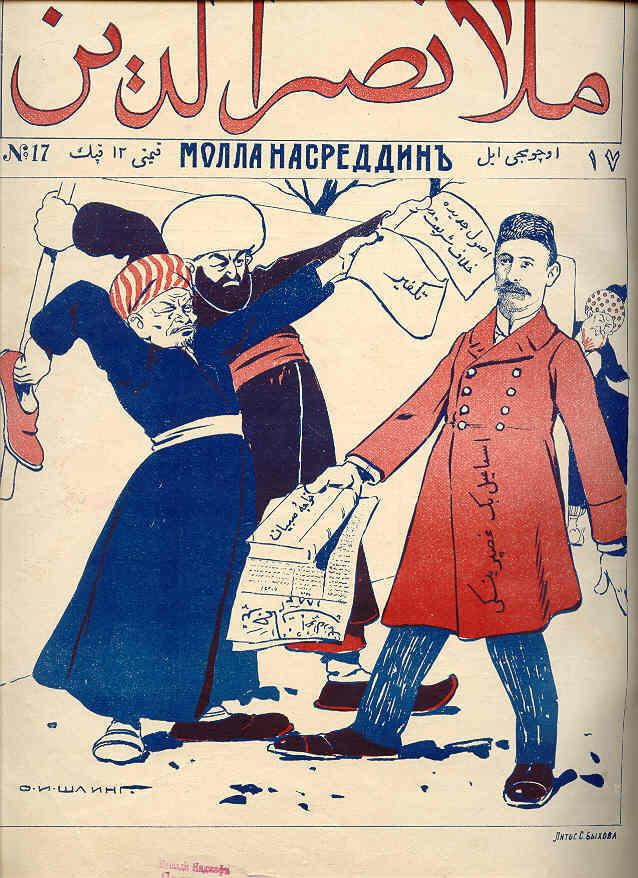
Caricature of Crimean Tatar educator and intellectual Ismail Gasprinsky (on right), depicted holding the newspaper Terciman ("The Translator") and the textbook Khoja-i-Sübyan ("The Teacher of Children") in his hand. Two men, respectively Tatar and Azerbaijani Muslim clerics, are threatening him with takfīr and sharīʿah decrees (on the left). From the satirical magazine Molla Nasreddin, N. 17, 28 April 1908, Tbilisi (illustrator: Oskar Schmerling).

Jadid thought often carried distinctly anti-clerical sentiment. Many members of the Muslim clergy opposed the Jadid's programs and ideologies, decrying them as un-Islamic, heretical innovations. Many Jadids saw these "Qadimists" (proponents of the old ways) not only as inhibitors of modern reform but also as corrupt, self-interested elites whose authority lay not in the Islamic faith as dictated by the Quran, ḥadīth literature, and sunnah, but rather in local tradition that were both inimical to "authentic" Islam and harmful to society. In his Arabic publication al-Nahḍah ("the Awakening"), the Crimean Tatar educator and intellectual Ismail Gasprinsky published satirical cartoons in Cairo, British-ruled Egypt that depict Muslim clerics, such as mullahs and sheikhs, as rapacious and lustful figures who prevented Muslim women from taking their rightful place as social equals and exploited the goodwill and trust of lay Turks.

Jadids asserted that the Ulama as a class were necessary for the enlightenment and preservation of the Turkic community, but they simultaneously declared Ulama who did not share their vision of reform to be unacquainted with authentic knowledge of Islam. Inevitably, those who opposed their modernist project were decried as motivated by self-interest rather than a desire to uplift their fellow Turks. Sufi mystics received an even more scathing indictment. Jadids saw the Ulama and the Sufis not as pillars of Islamic principals, but rather as proponents of a popular, unorthodox form of Islam that was hostile to both modernization and authentic Islamic tradition. Central Asian Jadids accused their leaders of permitting the moral decay of Islamic societies, as seen in the prevalence of alcoholism, pederasty, polygamy, and gender discrimination among Muslims, while simultaneously cooperating with Russian officials to cement their authority as elites.

Despite their anti-clericalism, the Jadids often had much in common with the Qadimists. Many of them were educated in traditional maktab and madrassas, and came from privileged families. As historian Adeeb Khalid asserts, Jadids and the Qadimist Ulama were essentially engaged in a battle over what values should project onto Central Asian culture. Jadids and Qadimists both sought to assert their own cultural values, with one group drawing its strategic strength from its relationship to modern forms of social organization and media and the other from its position as champion of an existing way of life in which it already occupied stations of authority.

== Educational reform ==
One of the Jadid's principal aims was educational reform. They wanted to create new schools that would teach quite differently from the maktabs, or primary schools, that existed throughout the Turkic areas of the Russian empire. The Jadids saw the traditional education system as "the clearest sign of stagnation, if not the degeneracy, of Central Asia." They felt that reforming the education system was the best way to reinvigorate a Turkic society ruled by outsiders. They criticized the maktabs' emphasis on memorization of religious texts rather than on explanation of those texts or on written language. Khalid refers to the memoirs of the Tajik Jadid Sadriddin Ayni, who attended a maktab in the 1890s; Ayni explained that he learned the Arabic alphabet as an aid to memorization but could not read unless he had already memorized the text in question.

The traditional education system was not the only option for Central Asian students, but it was far more popular than the alternative. Beginning in 1884, the tsarist government in Turkestan established "Russo-native" schools. They combined Russian language and history lessons with maktab-like instruction by native teachers. Many of the native teachers were Jadids, but the Russian schools did not reach a wide enough segment of the population to create the cultural reinvigoration the Jadids desired. Despite the Russian governor-general's assurances that students would learn all the same lessons they could expect from a maktab, very few children attended Russian schools. In 1916, for example, less than 300 Turks attended Russian higher primary schools in Central Asia.

In 1884, Ismail Gaspirali founded the first, the very first "new method" school in Crimea. Though the prominence of such schools among the Tatars rose rapidly, popularized by such thinkers as Ghabdennasir Qursawi, Musa Bigiev, and Gaspirali himself, the spread of new method schools to Central Asia was slower and more sporadic, despite the dedicated efforts of a close-knit community of reformers.

Jadids maintained that the traditional system of education did not produce graduates who had the requisite skills to successfully navigate the modern world, nor was it capable of elevating the cultural level of Turkic communities in the Russian Empire. The surest way to promote the development of Turks, according to the Jadids, was a radical change in the system of education. New method schools were an attempt to bring such a change about. In addition to teaching traditional maktab subjects, new method schools placed special emphasis on subjects such as geography, history, mathematics, and science. Probably the most important and widespread alteration to the traditional curriculum was the Jadids' insistence that children learn to read through phonetic methods that had more success in encouraging functional literacy. To this end, Jadids penned their own textbooks and primers, in addition to importing textbooks printed outside the Russian Turkestan in places such as Cairo, Tehran, Bombay, and Istanbul. Although many early textbooks (and teachers) came from European Russia, Central Asian Jadids also published texts, especially after the 1905 Revolution. The physical composition of new method schools was different as well, in some cases including the introduction of benches, desks, blackboards and maps into classrooms.

Jadid schools focused on literacy in native (often Turkic) languages rather than Russian or Arabic. Though Jadid schools, especially in Central Asia, retained a traditional focus, they taught "Islamic history and methods of thought" rather than just memorization. Unlike their traditional predecessors, Jadid schools did not allow corporal punishment. They also encouraged girls to attend, although few parents were willing to send their daughters.

== The press and print media ==
Many Jadids were heavily involved in printing and publishing, a relatively new enterprise for Turks in Russia. Early print matter created and distributed by commoners in Turkestan were generally lithographic copies of canonical manuscripts from traditional genres. From 1905 to 1917, 166 new Tatar language newspapers and magazines were published.

Turkestani Jadids, however, used print media to produce new-method textbooks, newspapers and magazines in addition to new plays and literature in a distinctly innovative idiom. Private (i.e., not state-run) newspapers in local languages were available to Tatars earlier and Gasprinski's newspaper Tercüman ("Interpreter") was a major organ of Jadid opinion that was widely read in all Turkic regions of the Empire.

The first appearance of a Turkic-language newspaper produced in Turkestan, however, dates to after the 1905 revolution. Adeeb Khalid describes a bookstore in Samarqand that in 1914 sold "books in Tatar, Ottoman, Arabic, and Persian on topics such as history, geography, general science, medicine, and religion, in addition to dictionaries, atlases, charts, maps, and globes." He explains that books from the Arab world and translations of European works influenced Central Asian Jadids. Newspapers advocated modernization and reform of institutions such as the school system. Tatars who lived in Central Asia (like the socialist Ismail Abidiy) published some of these newspapers. Central Asians, however, published many of their own papers from 1905 until the Russian authorities forbade their publication again in 1908.

The content of these papers varied – some were extremely critical of the traditional hierarchy, while others sought to win over more conservative clergy. Some explained the importance of Central Asian participation in Russian politics through the Duma, while others sought to connect Central Asian intellectuals to those in cities like Cairo and Istanbul. The Jadids also used fiction to communicate the same ideas, drawing on Central Asian as well as Western forms of literature (poetry and plays, respectively). For example, the Bukharan author Abdurrauf Fitrat criticized the clergy for discouraging the modernization he believed was necessary to protect Central Asia from Russian incursions.

Central Asian Jadids used such mass-media as an opportunity to mobilize support for their projects, present critiques of local cultural practices, and generally advocate and advance their platform of modernist reform as a cure for the societal ills plaguing the Turkestan. Despite the dedication of their producers, Jadidist papers in Central Asia usually had very small circulations and print runs that made it difficult for publications to maintain their existence without significant patronage. Jadids publishing in Turkestan also sometimes ran afoul of their Russian censors, who viewed them as potentially subversive elements.

== Jadids by location ==
=== Bashkortostan ===
Zaynulla Rasulev, a prominent Bashkir leader in the 19th century, was among the most important representatives of Jadidism and the organizer of one of the first Jadidi madrasah.

=== Tatarstan ===
Some of them were supporters of reforms (Ğ. Barudi, Musa Bigiev, Ğ. İbrahimov, Q. Tärcemäni, C. Abızgildin, Z. Qadíri, Z. Kamali, Ğ Bubí et al.), while others wanted educational reforms only (R. Fäxretdinev, F. Kärimi, Ş. Kültäsi et al.).

=== North Caucasus ===
North Caucasian and Turkic languages were used in writings circulated by Jadids in the North Caucasus. Persian was the language of Jadidists at the commence of the 1900s in Central Asia and there was no broad scheme or ideology of pan-Turkism among Jadidists.

=== Central Asia ===
For the most part, the Russian population of Turkestan viewed religious practice as counter to civilization and culture. Therefore, the Russians had a particular distaste for traditional authority figures, like the Ulama and the Islamic clergy, who they viewed as dangerous extremists. On the other hand, the Russians held the Jadids in much higher regard because of the progressive and secular nature of their reforms. However, the Russians maintained the idea that the Central Asian population of Turkestan should have separate living spaces and limited voting rights.

In terms of keeping the Russian and Central Asian populations separate, residence in Tashkent, the capital of Turkestan, was limited to Russian elites. Furthermore, most cities in Turkestan had distinct quarters for Russians and "natives" (a pejorative term for Central Asians). To limit the political power of the Jadids, while giving the appearance of creating a more accessible political system in line with the 1905 October Manifesto, the Russians divided Turkestan's population into "native" and "non-native" electoral franchises, each with the ability to send one representative to the Duma. This system gave the "non-native" franchise a two-thirds majority in the Duma, despite consisting of less than ten percent of Turkestan's population. Because of Russian authority and political maneuvering, the Jadids failed to achieve their goals for equality under the Imperial rule of Turkestan.

Tashkent was where Munawwar Qari founded Central Asia's initial school on the Jadid model. Russian, Jadidist, and traditionalist schools all ran alongside one another under Russian rule. A policy of deliberately enforcing anti-modern, traditional, ancient conservative Islamic education in schools and Islamic ideology was enforced by the Russians in order to deliberately hamper and destroy opposition to their rule by keeping them in a state of torpor to and prevent foreign ideologies from penetrating in.

Russia's institutions of learning run by Jadidist numbered over 5,000 in 1916. The Jadidists inspired an Artush-based school founded by Bawudun Musabayov and Husayn Musabayov. Jadid like schools were built by the Uyghur Progress Union of Kashgar after 1934. Jadidist leader Gasprinskii inspired Burhan Shahidi. The First East Turkestan Republic in Kashgar's Interior Minister was Yunus Beg, who previously worked with Maqsud Muhiti, a merchant who spread Jadidism in Turfan. Jadid schools were founded in Xinjiang for Chinese Tatars. Jadidist Tatars taught the Uighur Ibrahim Muti'i. The Jadidists popularized the identity of "Turkestani". Some Jadids and Muhammad Amin Bughra (Mehmet Emin) and Masud Sabri rejected the imposition of the name "Uyghur" upon the Turkic people of Xinjiang. They wanted instead the name "Turkic ethnicity" to be applied to their people. Masud Sabri also viewed the Hui people as Han Chinese and separate from his own people. Muhammad Amin Bughra, Shemsiddin Damolla, Abdukerimhan Mehsum, Sabit Damulla Abdulbaki, and Abdulqadir Damolla were all Jadists who took part in the First East Turkestan Republic. In 1913, in Turfan, an institution for training teachers in Jadidist methods was founded by Heyder Sayrani, a Tatar, and Mukhsut Muhiti, a local merchant in Turfan.

Some Turkmen were hostile to the idea of one Turkestani language for all Central Asians proposed by the Jadidists. Some Turkmen were against the Turkestani identity promoted by the Jadid and the Chagatai-based Turkestani speech promoted by the Jadid. Alyshbeg Aliev, Muhammetgulu Atabaev and Muhammetgylych Bichare Nizami were among the Jadidist Turkmens while Bukhara and Tashkent were the centers of Jadidist activity. The policy of deliberately encouraging the neglect of culture and economy of the Turks was implemented by the Russian government and struggled against by the Jadid. Turar Ryskulov, a Kazakh, was a Jadidist. Muhammad Geldiev, a Jadidist, was an influence on the formulation of literary Turkmen whose genesis was tasked to a commission in 1921. The creation of accurate historical narrative was desired by the Jadidists.

== Jadid–Bolshevik relations ==
=== After 1917 ===
With the October Revolution of 1917, the Bolsheviks aimed to create states for separate ethnic groups that answered to a central authority. The Jadids, greatly attracted to the promotion of Central Asian liberation, embarked on language reform, "new-method" teaching, and expansive cultural projects with renewed fervor after 1917. By the early 1920s, the Jadids finally felt comfortable allying the channels of Bolsheviks, allowing them to participate in the government on a more equal standing with the Russians. Also, in order to further reap the benefits of the Soviets, large numbers of Jadids joined the Communist Party.

For their part, the Bolsheviks were willing to assist the Jadids in realizing their national goals, but only on Bolshevik terms and interests. While the Bolsheviks created the structures needed to fully realize the Jadids' dreams (state-funded schools, a print sphere immune to market forces, new organs of political authority) the Bolsheviks maintained their own agenda for harnessing the energies of the Jadid mobilization effort. This agenda focused on political education through postering, newspaper articles, film, and theater. Essentially, the Bolsheviks wanted to opportunistically use the facilities they had established on the Jadids behalf to disseminate political propaganda and educate the Central Asian masses about the socialist revolution.

At the same time, Bolsheviks and Jadids did not always see eye-to-eye on how the socialist revolution should play out. The Jadids hoped to establish a Turkic nation, while the Bolsheviks envisioned a more divided Central Asia based on ethnographic data. As a formal challenge to the Bolshevik model of nation building, the Jadids founded a unified provisional government in the city of Kokand, with the intention of remaining autonomous from the USSR. After lasting only one year, 1917–1918, Kokand was brutally crushed by the forces of the Tashkent Soviet; around 14,000 people, including many leading Jadids, were killed in the ensuing massacre.

As the Jadids became more comfortable with the inner workings of the Soviets, the Bolsheviks determined that they could no longer completely manipulate them. As a result, the Bolsheviks established local Central Asian cadres who were ideologically bound to socialist revolutionism and disconnected from Turkic cultural practice. Ultimately, this class grew to overshadow the Jadids and displaced them from public life.

=== After 1926 ===
With the death of Vladimir Lenin in 1924, Joseph Stalin began his push for power, ultimately leading to the elimination of his political opponents and his consolidation of power. As a result of this consolidation, by 1926 the Communist Party felt secure in its Central Asian regional power to lead the charge against traditional authorities without the assistance of the Jadids. Even worse, the Jadids became the victims of the very same purges inflicted upon their primary rivals, the Ulama and the Islamic clergy. The Jadids were denounced as the mouthpiece of the local bourgeoisie and were considered counterrevolutionary agents that should be stripped of their jobs, arrested, and executed if necessary.

Throughout the remainder of the 1920s and 1930s, virtually the entire intelligentsia of Central Asia, including leading Jadid writers and poets such as Cholpan and Abdurrauf Fitrat were purged. However, Jadids have now been rehabilitated as "Uzbek National Heroes" in Uzbekistan.

"Hindustānda bir farangi il bukhārālik bir mudarrisning birnecha masalalar ham usul-i jadida khususida qilghan munāzarasi" was written by Abdulrauf Fitrat. Behbudi wrote the Paradkush.

Ubaydullah Khojaev was involved in both Turkic and Russian media.

The schools running according to Jadidist methods appeared in the last decade of the 19th century, which added to the already existing old madrassah and maktab system.

== See also ==
- Majid Qodiri
- Mujaddid
- Soviet Central Asia
- Soviet Union
- Islam
- Uzbeks
- Uzbekistan
- Young Bukharans
- Young Khivans

== Literature ==
- Bergne, Paul (2003). "The Kokand Autonomy 1917-18. Political background, Aims and Reasons for Failure". In Tom Everett-Heath (ed.). Central Asia. Aspects of Transition. London.
- Fedtke, Gero (1998). "Jadids, Young Bukharans, Communists and the Bukharan Revolution. From an Ideological Debate in the Early Soviet Union". In Anke von Kügelgen (ed.). Muslim Culture in Russia and Central Asia. Inter-regional & Inter-ethnic Relations. Berlin.
- Allworth, Edward (1989). "The focus of literature". In Edward Allworth (ed.). Central Asia: 120 Years of Russian Rule. Durham, NC: Duke University Press. ISBN 978-0-8223-0930-7.
- d'Encausse, Hélène Carrère (1989). "Social and political reform". In Edward Allworth (ed.). Central Asia: 120 Years of Russian Rule. Durham, NC: Duke University Press. ISBN 978-0-8223-0930-7.
- Keller, Shoshana (2001). To Moscow, Not Mecca: The Soviet Campaign Against Reform in Central Asia, 1917–1941. Westport, CT: Praeger Publishers. ISBN 978-0-275-97238-7.
- Khalid, Adeeb (1998). The Politics of Muslim Cultural Reform: Jadidism in Central Asia. Berkeley, CA: University of California Press. ISBN 978-0-520-21356-2.
- —— (2001). "Nationalizing the revolution in Central Asia: the transformation of Jadidism, 1917–1920". In Ronald Grigor Suny & Terry Martin (ed.). A State of Nations: Empire and Nation-Making in the Age of Lenin and Stalin. New York, NY: Oxford University Press. ISBN 978-0-19-514423-9.
- —— (2006). "Backwardness and the quest for civilization: early Soviet Central Asia in comparative perspective". Slavic Review. 65 (2): 231–251. doi:10.2307/4148591. JSTOR 4148591. S2CID 163421953.
- —— (1994). "Printing, publishing, and reform in tsarist Central Asia" (PDF). International Journal of Middle East Studies. 26 (2): 187–200. doi:10.1017/S0020743800060207. S2CID 159647228.
- Kirimli, H. (1993). The "Young Tatar" Movement in the Crimea, 1905-1909. Cahiers Du Monde Russe Et Soviétique, 34(4), 529-560. Retrieved from https://www.jstor.org/stable/20170880
- Kuttner, Thomas (1975). "Russian Jadīdism and the Islamic world: Ismail Gasprinskii in Cairo, 1908. A call to the Arabs for the rejuvenation of the Islamic world". Cahiers du Monde Russe et Soviétique. 16 (3): 383–424. doi:10.3406/cmr.1975.1247.
- Sahadeo, Jeff (2007). "Progress or peril: migrants and locals in Russian Tashkent, 1906-1914". In Nicholas B. Breyfogle, Abby M. Schrader & Willard Sunderland (ed.). Peopling the Russian Periphery: Borderland Colonization in Eurasian History. London: Routledge. ISBN 978-0-415-41880-5.
- Абдирашидов, Зайнабидин (2011). Исмаил Гаспринский и Туркестан в начале ХХ века: связи-отношения-влияние. Ташкент: Akademnashr. ISBN 9789943373976.
- Минтс, И. И. (1967). Победа Советской Власти в Средней Азии и Казахстане. Tashkent.
- S. A. Dudoignon & F. Georgon (ed.). "Le Réformisme Musulman en Asie Centrale. Du "premier renouveau" à la Soviétisation 1788–1937". Cahiers du Monde Russe. 37.
