= The Politics of Muslim Cultural Reform =

Book on the history of Jadidism in Central Asia

The Politics of Muslim Cultural Reform: Jadidism in Central Asia
- Author: Adeeb Khalid
- Language: English
- Series: Comparative Studies on Muslim Societies, UC Press
- Subject: History of Central Asia
- Genre: Non-fiction, History
- Publisher: University of California Press
- Publication date: 1998
- Publication place: United States
- Media type: Hardcover, Paperback, Kindle
- Pages: 400pp. (Hardcover)
- ISBN: 978-0520213555
- Website: Book webpage

The Politics of Muslim Cultural Reform: Jadidism in Central Asia is a 1998 book by Adeeb Khalid, published by the University of California Press. The work is part of the Comparative Studies on Muslim Societies series.

== Synopsis ==
During the late nineteenth and early twentieth century, a reformist modernizing movement swept into the different parts of the Islamic world. This movement is usually associated with the impact of European and Russian colonialism. Khalid's work focuses on the development of the Jadidism reform movement from the 1860s to the 1920s in tsarist Central Asia, primarily centered in the province of Turkestan and its capital in Tashkent. The book is based on Persian, Turkish, and Russian-language sources; the writings of the Jadids themselves are frequently cited and valuable biographical sketches of prominent Jadids are interspersed through the book.

For lay readers and non-specialists, The Politics of Muslim Cultural Reform forms an introduction to the cultural and social history of Central Asia during the nineteenth and early twentieth centuries. For specialists, the work increases understanding about the origins and development of nationalism in Central Asia, looks at Jadidism within the wider context of evolving intellectual discussion in the Muslim world, linking thought and developments Central Asia to similar processes in the Ottoman Empire, Iran, South Asia, and the Arab world.

The author explores the impact both European colonialism and other Muslim societies had on the Jadidist movement. He moves the picture from Central Asia being on the periphery of discussion about the Russian Empire, to being a center of the Muslim world, showing it as both part of that world and a unique expression of it. The Russian Empire had similar movements among Muslim peoples in different parts of the empire, notably among the Crimean and Volga Tartars; Khalid's work focuses on what made Central Asian Jadidism different and distinctive, while also exploring how it interacted with other movements. The author moves past normal dualistic approaches to the topic, such as modem vs. premodem and Russian vs. Muslim, and sees a more nuanced picture where all these forces interact to create a unique Central Asian engagement with modernity.

== Structure ==
The book begins with an introduction which sets out the author's perspective, goals, and the parameters of the work. The author provides an overview of traditional Islamic education in Central Asia and a discussion of how the Russian conquest of Central Asia impacted social life and norms.

After covering historical background, the book continues into chapters and topics such as "The Making of a Colonial Society", "Knowledge and Society in the Nineteenth Century", "Knowledge as Salvation", "The Politics of Admonition", and "The Origins of Jadidism". Chapters 4, 5 and 6, discuss the Jadids' writings, educational work, and developing views.

The book concludes with an epilogue summarizing the movement and the authors conclusions; The book contains an extensive bibliography of secondary literature, but lacks a glossary of non-English words.

== Reception ==
"The book's discussion of the way incorporation into the Russian Empire changed life for the indigenous inhabitants of the governorship-general of Turkestan is one of the best treatments of that subject in print." — Muriel Atkin, Department of History, George Washington University.

"If there is a criticism to be made of this otherwise excellent book, it is that there is too little attempt to locate Central Asian reformist thinking in the history of other modernizing trends in Islam of a similar period." — Shirin Akiner, School of Oriental and African Studies, University of London.

== Release information ==
- Hardcover: 1998 (First Edition), University of California Press, 400pp. ISBN 978-0520213555. (Note: Also available for Kindle.)
- Paperback: 1999, University of California Press, 400pp. ISBN 978-0520213562.

== About the author ==
Adeeb Khalid is Jane and Raphael Bernstein Professor of Asian Studies and History at Carleton College. His research and writing specializes in the history of Central Asia, the Russian empire and Soviet Union, the Ottoman Empire, and the intersections between nationalism, empire, Islam, and modernity. He received a bachelor's degree in political science from McGill University in 1986, and his doctorate in history in 1993 from the University of Wisconsin-Madison.

== See also ==
- Turkestan
- Russian conquest of Central Asia
- The Great Game
- Pierre Bourdieu
- Hélène Carrère d'Encausse
