= Charles Kurzman =

American sociologist (born 1963)

- Employer: University of North Carolina at Chapel Hill

Academic background
- Education: Harvard University (BA); University of California, Berkeley; (MA, PhD)

Charles Kurzman (born 1963) is a professor of sociology at University of North Carolina at Chapel Hill who specializes in Middle East and Islamic studies.

== Education and employment ==
After completing his B.A. at Harvard University in 1986, he completed his M.A. and PhD. at University of California, Berkeley in 1987 and 1992 respectively. He has been affiliated with University of North Carolina at Chapel Hill since 1998.

== Books ==
- —— (2011). The Missing Martyrs: Why There Are So Few Muslim Terrorists (2nd ed.). New York: Oxford University Press. ISBN 9780190907976.
- —— (2011). The Missing Martyrs: Why There Are So Few Muslim Terrorists (1st ed.). New York: Oxford University Press. ISBN 9780199766871.
- —— (2008). Democracy Denied, 1905-1915: Intellectuals and the Fate of Democracy. Cambridge, MA: Harvard University Press. doi:10.4159/9780674039858. ISBN 9780674039858.
- —— (2004). The Unthinkable Revolution in Iran. Cambridge, MA: Harvard University Press.
- ——, ed. (2002). Modernist Islam, 1840-1940: A Sourcebook. New York: Oxford University Press. ISBN 9780198035213.
- —— (1998). Liberal Islam: A Sourcebook. New York: Oxford University Press. ISBN 9780195116212.
