= Adeeb Khalid =

Professor of Asian Studies

Adeeb Khalid (born February 17, 1964) is associate professor and Jane and Raphael Bernstein Professor of Asian Studies and History in the history department of Carleton College in Northfield, Minnesota. His academic contributions are highly cited.

== Scientific career ==
After BA degrees at Government College University, Lahore and at McGill University in Montreal, he graduated PhD at the University of Wisconsin–Madison.

Khalid's research focuses on the history of Central Asian Islam since the Russian conquests in the 1860s - he pays special attention to cultural transformation, identity as a result of historical changes and the fate of Islam under Imperial Russian and Soviet rule.

Khalid's research has been supported by institutions such as the John Simon Guggenheim Memorial Foundation, the Carnegie Corporation, the National Endowment for the Humanities, the American Council of Learned Societies, the National Council for Eurasian and East European Research and the International Research & Exchanges Board. In addition to articles in anthologies, Khalid has written four of his own non-fiction books. His first, The Politics of Muslim Cultural Reform (1998), is a standard work on Jadidism in Central Asia; the second, Islam after Communism (2007), was awarded the Wayne S. Vucinich Book Prize of the Association for Slavic, East European, and Eurasian Studies. The third work published in 2015 was Making Uzbekistan, which deals with the history of Central Asia in the early Soviet period (1917-1932). June 2021 is Central Asia. A New History from the Imperial Conquests to the Present published by Princeton University Press.

== Honors and awards ==
Khalid has received a number of honors and awards some of which are listed here:

- Wayne S. Vucinich Book Prize for "Islam after Communism", AAASS, 2008.
- Reginald Zelnik Book Prize for "Making Uzbekistan", ASEEES, 2016
- Carleton College Dean’s Fellowship, 2016–17
- National Endowment for the Humanities Fellowship for College Teachers and Independent Scholars, 1995–96
- John Simon Guggenheim Memorial Foundation fellowship, 2005
- American Council of Learned Societies fellowship 2005-6
- National Endowment for the Humanities fellowship 2005-6
- Carnegie Scholar, 2005–07.
- American Councils for International Education Research Scholarship, 2000–01.

== Works ==
A listing of Khalid's edited works, his articles in scholarly anthologies and journals, and works he has translated can be found in his Carleton College profile online.

- Adeeb Khalid: The Politics of Muslim Cultural Reform: Jadidism in Central Asia. Comparative Studies in Muslim Societies, Volume 27. (Online version) Berkeley: University of California Press, 1998. ISBN 9780520213562
- Adeeb Khalid: Islam after Communism: Religion and Politics in Central Asia. Berkeley: University of California Press, 2007. ISBN 9780520249271
- Adeeb Khalid: Making Uzbekistan: Nation, Empire, and Revolution in the Early USSR. Ithaca: Cornell University Press, 2015. ISBN 9780801454097
- Adeeb Khalid: Central Asia. A New History from the Imperial Conquests to the Present. Princeton: Princeton University Press, 2021. ISBN 9780691161396
