= Kolesov's Campaign =

Power struggle during the Russian Civil War

- Part of the Bukhara Revolution and Basmachi movement
Date	March 1918
Location	Emirate of Bukhara, Turkestan Soviet Federative Republic
Result	Victory of the Bukhara Emirate; Kizyl–Tepe Agreement

Belligerents
RSFSR; Young Bukharans	Emirate of Bukhara Basmachi movement

Commanders and leaders
(Russian Soviet Federative Socialist Republic) Fyodor Kolesov (Russian Soviet Federative Socialist Republic) Kishishev; Fayzulla Xoʻjayev	(Emirate of Bukhara) Emir Muhammad Alim Khan

Strength
(Russian Soviet Federative Socialist Republic) 6,000; ~2,000	(Emirate of Bukhara) 10,000+

Kolesov's Campaign was an unsuccessful attempt to seize power in the Emirate of Bukhara by the Russian Bolsheviks and Young Bukharans during the Russian Civil War (March 1918).

== Alignment of political forces in Turkestan ==
After the Bolsheviks came to power in October 1917, the Council of People's Commissars of the Russian Socialist Federative Soviet Republic recognized the independence of Bukhara and canceled the agreement on the protectorate of Russia. In Tashkent, after an armed uprising, a government was established, consisting of Bolsheviks and Left Socialist Revolutionaries. In Bukhara itself, under the influence of the events taking place in Russia, the confrontation between the government of the emir and the Young Bukharians, a political movement that emerged from Jadidism, is intensifying. Against the background of unsuccessful attempts to persuade the emir to carry out limited reforms, the leaders of the Young Bukharians set a course for preparing an armed uprising and turned their eyes to the revolutionary government in Tashkent.

== Preparation of the action ==
In early December 1917, the Young Bukharians came into contact with the Bolsheviks. A delegation of the Central Committee of the Young Bukharians headed by Fayzulla Khodjaev is sent to Tashkent in order to enlist the support of Tashkent in the upcoming armed uprising. During the uprising, according to the plans of the Young Bukharians, a revolutionary government was to be formed, and the emir was assigned only a decorative function. The government of Turkestan was required to help the Young Bukharians with weapons, and, if necessary, with troops.

During the negotiations of Fayzulla Khodjaev with the chairman of the Council of People's Commissars of Soviet Turkestan Fyodor Kolesov, the latter approved the plans of the Young Bukharians and promised support, advising to postpone the uprising until the end of the liquidation of the Kokand Autonomy.

New Bukhara (Kagan) became the center of preparation for the uprising. After the successful suppression of the Kokand Autonomy and success with the performance of demobilized Cossack units in Samarkand, Kolesov appears in New Bukhara in early March and informs the Young Bukharians that the performance should take place in five days, and once again promised to bring weapons, ammunition and troops. This news was unexpected for the Young Bukharians. Plans to organize a large–scale uprising, for which there was no weapon, no time, have to be abandoned. The Central Committee of the Young Bukharians forms a revolutionary committee in New Bukhara headed by Fayzulla Khodjaev and arms a detachment of its supporters numbering 200 people.

== Chronology of events ==
The Turkestan government, consisting of Bolsheviks and Socialist Revolutionaries, embarked on a course to support the Young Bukharians and to overthrow the emir. Meanwhile, the Turkestan government did not expect serious resistance from the emir, hoping for the all–round support of the revolutionary forces inside Bukhara.

It was not in our interests to start a war with Seyid Alimkhan. The Turkestan Republic was already bleeding to death. For the Bukhara expedition, only about a thousand fighters were able to be selected. These were poorly armed detachments gathered from all parts of Turkestan. Even the Samarkand garrison, which was considered one of the strongest, was able to send to Kagan only an "armored bandage" with an infantry company and a platoon of cavalry – only 120 people...

— Ivan Kuts. Years in the Saddle // Moscow: "Military Publishing House of the Ministry of Defense of the Soviet Union", 1964 – 152 Pages. (Military Memoirs) / Literary Edition by O. M. Ivanov

In early March, units of the Red Guard under the command of the Chairman of the Council of People's Commissars Fyodor Kolesov were concentrated in Kagan. In total, the campaign was attended by: Samarkand, Kushkin, Trans–Caspian, Tashkent, Chardzhu and Kagan detachments, sailors of the Amu Darya flotilla, a detachment of Young Bukharians. The Chief of Staff was the commander of the Amu Darya flotilla, 1st Rank Captain Kishishev.

An ultimatum was presented to the Emir of Bukhara demanding that he relinquish power. The text of the ultimatum required: "To dissolve the government existing under you and to appoint in its place the Executive Committee of the Young Bukharians". The emir's government initially agreed to accept the ultimatum. Alim Khan pretended to concede and sent the text of the new manifesto: "Providing all our people with freedom of speech, freedom of trade, freedom of society... we establish an Executive Committee within the Bukhara liberals and carry out all reforms according to the program and instructions of this Committee...". During the negotiations with Kolesov, the following terms of surrender were discussed. Representatives of the Turkestan government leave for Old Bukhara and disarm the emir's troops. They will be accompanied by a convoy of 25 Red Army cavalrymen. The next day, under the protection of a detachment of five hundred people, the Bukhara Revolutionary Committee arrives in the capital and declares itself to be the government. The rest of the units depart for the Kagan station. At the same time, the emir leaves Old Bukhara, who is guaranteed unhindered passage outside the khanate, wherever he wishes.

But a detachment of parliamentarians, which entered Bukhara together with a convoy of 25 people, accompanied by the highest Bukhara dignitaries, was unexpectedly attacked and almost completely destroyed. From the memoirs of a participant in the events:

The details of this difficult incident soon became clear. The highest officials of the emir greeted our envoys as expected. After exchanging greetings, they were taken to a room located next to Alimkhan's palace. The guards remained at the gate. The soldiers lit a cigarette and looked trustingly at the people who surrounded them. Suddenly someone shouted: "Death to the unbelievers!". A sarbaz emerged from somewhere, jumped to the Red Guardsman and slashed him with a saber. A revolver shot followed in response. The crowd, incited by Alimkhan's henchmen, rushed to the convoy. A hot fight ensued. Arsen Tsaturov, working with a blade, tried to break out of the encirclement, but was hit by a bullet. Others, defended by a dense group, were gradually separated and torn apart. Only two were miraculously saved. They delivered the terrible news.

— Ivan Kuts. Years in the Saddle // Moscow: "Military Publishing House of the Ministry of Defense of the Soviet Union", 1964 – 152 Pages. (Military Memoirs) / Literary Edition by O. M. Ivanov

Kolesov resumes hostilities, but the emir mobilizes all residents of Bukhara to repulse the Bolsheviks. As a participant in the events recalled, "Yesterday only Alimkhan's army and several hundred religious fanatics were against us. Now thousands of Bukharians have joined it". Bukhara troops attacked military units in Kagan. The situation of the Bolsheviks near Bukhara was complicated by the fact that the Bukhara government destroyed the railway tracks in a timely manner, which is why at the most crucial moment the Merv detachment, stopped in Karakul, did not come to the place of the battle, and the expected echelon with ammunition from Tashkent (stuck at the station Kermine).

Realizing the futility of further struggle, Kolesov decides to retreat in the direction of Samarkand – Tashkent, evacuating the population of Kagan (mainly Europeans) together with the troops. As a participant in the campaign recalls: "The carriages were packed with women, old people and children. They carried home belongings with them. All those who were threatened with certain death were going to leave with us". The retreat took several days along a partially destroyed railway. The trains were constantly attacked by Bukhara troops. One of the main problems is the lack of water in the unit. As a participant in the hike recalls: "Water supplies were quickly depleted. A severe drinking regime was established. Reinforced guards were posted near the vats. Here almost always women crowded in the vain hope to beg for an additional portion of moisture for the children...". The Kolesov's echelons were rescued by a detachment expelled from Tashkent, led by the Left Socialist Revolutionaries Koluzaev, Petrenko and Stepanov.

In addition to attempts to destroy the echelons that left the Kagan, the Bukhara army carried out a number of raids across the territory of the Turkestan Republic with the aim of destroying villages and European residents along the railway junctions.

The peace treaty with the Bukhara government was signed on March 25, 1918, at the Kizyl–Tepe station. Alimkhan pledged to compensate for the losses caused to Soviet Turkestan and to limit his armed forces to 12 thousand people. A permanent Soviet representative was appointed to Old Bukhara. The population evacuated from the Kagan was returning.

Meanwhile, in Bukhara itself, a massacre was staged, in which up to one and a half thousand supporters of the Young Bukharians died. About 8,000 people, including the overwhelming part of the Young Bukharians, emigrated from Bukhara. Among the emigrants was the writer Sadriddin Aini. Defeat, brutal reprisals, the threat of destruction and emigration to a large extent brought the Young Bukharians closer to the Bolsheviks, some of them became members of the newly created Bukhara Communist Party. In 1918–1919, Fayzulla Khodjaev worked in the People's Commissariat for Foreign Affairs of the Russian Socialist Federative Soviet Republic and organized a branch of the Young Bukharian Party in Moscow, and upon his arrival in Tashkent in 1920, the Central Bureau of the Young Bukharian Revolutionary Party.

== See also ==
- Bukhara Operation (1920)
- Revolution in Bukhara
- Bukhara Khanate
- Bukhara People's Soviet Republic
