= Bukharan Revolution =

1917–1925 overthrow of the Emirate of Bukhara

- Part of Russian Civil War
Date	1917–1925
Location	Bukhara, Emirate of Bukhara (now Uzbekistan)
Result	Red army victory
Territorial changes	Establishment of the Bukharan PSR in 1920.

Belligerents
Russian SFSR; Young Bukharans	Emirate of Bukhara

Commanders and leaders
(Russian Soviet Federative Socialist Republic) Mikhail Frunze	Emir Muhammad Alim Khan

The Bukharan Revolution refers to the events of 1917–1925, which led to the elimination of the Emirate of Bukhara in 1920, the formation of the Bukharan People's Soviet Republic, the intervention of the Red Army, the mass armed resistance of the population (see Basmachi) and its suppression, the inclusion of the republic into the Soviet Union on 27 October 1924, as a separate union republic, the elimination of the newly established republic as a result of national delimitation and the formation of the Uzbek SSR, the Turkmen SSR and Tajik ASSR (from 1929 the Tajik SSR) in 1924.

== Bukhara during the 1917 revolution ==
=== Bukhara and the Provisional Government of Russia ===
The overthrow of autocracy in Russia caused a sudden revival in the public life of the Bukhara Emirate. The Bukhara oppositionists counted on the help of the new Russia in the liberalization of the Emir regime. In turn, Emir Sayid Alim Khan issued a manifesto proclaiming reform. However, Fayzulla Khodzhaev pointed out that the resident and his inner circle of the Provisional Government have not changed compared to the times of autocracy, and provided great support to the Emir in the reactionary undertakings. In 1917, the Provisional Government reaffirmed the independence of the Bukhara Emirate.

=== Young Bukharians ===
The Young Bukhara movement emerged from Jadidism but acquired political overtones over time. It made itself known in April 1917. Immediately following the release of the Emir's manifesto, which proclaimed the long-awaited reform, the Young Bukharians organized a demonstration in which up to 5-7 thousand people took part. In response, a counter-manifestation was held on the square in front of the palace of the Emir numbering 7-8 thousand, and troops were also brought up. Fearing bloodshed, the leaders of the demonstrators persuaded people to return to their homes. On the same day, repressions followed. Many Jadidists, who took part in the demonstration, were seized, part of them were punished by beating with sticks, others fled to Kagan, which was then New Bukhara. However, fearing the reaction of the Provisional Government, the Emir soon released the detainees.

With the help of the rightist wing, the Young Bukhara Central Committee was reorganized. An influential Bukhara millionaire Mukhitdin Mansurov, who supported Jadidism and was forced to migrate to Turkestan, became chairman. Other members of the new Central Committee: Abdu Kadyr Mukhitdinov, Mukhitdin Rafaat, Abdu Vahid Burkhanov, Usman Khodjaev, Arif Karimov, Mirza Isam Mukhitdinov, Musa Saidzhanov, Mukhtar Saidzhanov, Fayzulla Khodjaev and two others who were later excluded because of non-participation in the activities of the Central Committee. Their place was taken by Fitrat and Ata Khojayev, members of the old Central Committee. According to Fayzulla Khodjaev, the essence of the reorganization was the inclusion of Mukhitdin Mansurov and his sons in the Central Committee.

After that, unsuccessful negotiations with the Emir, which were conducted by the newly elected Chairman of the Central Committee, were organized. The delegation of the Young Bukharians was able to return from the talks only thanks to the support of members of the council of workers and soldier deputies of New Bukhara. The failure of the negotiations leads to a new reorganization of the Young Bukharians, in which the initiative was taken by the left wing. This was also connected with the change in the social composition, the inclusion of the lower urban strata in the movement.

The new central committee acted in line with the preservation of the unity of the movement. The leftist wing of the Young Bukharians themselves put forward a program developed by Fitrat, which, however, contained the most moderate ideas supported by the whole movement. It put forward mainly the reforms of management, finance, and education.

=== The attempt of the intervention of the Red Army in 1918 ===
The independence of the Emirate was confirmed by a decree of the Soviet government. Before that, the Young Bukharians wanted to use the support of the Bolsheviks, but, according to Fayzulla Khodjaev, the chairman of the SNK of the Turkestan SSR Fyodor Kolesov refused to do so due to political considerations - a still ripening counter-revolutionary Kokand autonomy threatened the fragile Soviet republic.

However, immediately after its defeat, it was decided to end the Emirate of Bukhara. However, the weak preparation of the Young Bukharians for the uprising, the lack of broad support among the population, as well as a number of blunders, led to the failure of the March events, the retreat of the Red Guards and Young Bukharians, as well as part of the population of Old Bukhara.

Subsequently, Kolesov himself regarded the campaign as a failure:

Supporting the people’s right for self-determination, we expected that the beliefs of the Young Bukharians were shared by the majority of the people of Bukhara. The current state of war shows that there are absolutely no masses, no people supporting the Young Bukharians... We declare the ending of military actions.

— Farhad Kasymov, Bakhodir Ergashev, Bukhara Revolution

After an unsuccessful attempt to overthrow the Emir, a peace treaty was concluded between Russia and Bukhara and the independence of Bukhara was reaffirmed.

== Emirate liquidation in 1920 ==
=== The position of the Emir regarding the Basmachi in Turkestan ===
After the failure of the Soviet intervention in Bukhara, the RSFSR again confirmed the independence of Bukhara. However, Soviet Turkestan became a haven for many fleeing opponents of the Emir, and subsequently the two main revolutionary forces of Bukhara - the Communist Party and the Turkburo of the revolutionary Young Bukharians. In turn, Bukhara became, according to F. Khodjaev, "the center of reaction in Central Asia" — the White Guards fled there, repressions were fought against dissidents, and the Emir was actively re-arming his troops.

=== Creation of the Bukhara Communist Party ===
The idea of creating a separate Bukhara Communist Party (BKP) was raised at meetings of emigrants (some of whom were already in the RCP(b)) from Bukhara in Kagan and Tashkent (April 17–19, 1918). It is believed that in the summer of 1918 a group of Young Bukharians headed by A. Yakubov made the same decision. On September 25, 1918, a meeting of the communists and the Yakubov group was held in Tashkent. The formation of the BKP was proclaimed on it, and the party’s Central Committee was elected (A. Yakubov - chairman; M. Kulmukhamedov, X. M. Mirmuhsinov, M. Parzulla, A. Yuldashbekov). However, other historians consider the end of 1919 to be the date of the formation when a group of Young Bukharians decided to rename into the Bukhara Communist Party at the III Congress. On December 23, 1918, the BKP Central Committee adopted the Provisional Program of the Party, which set the task of overthrowing the power of the Emir of Bukhara and establishing a democratic republic on the basis of the Soviets. By the beginning of 1919, the offices of the BKP operated in Kagan, Samarkand, Katta-Kuragna, Kerkah, Termez, etc. Underground organizations of the BKP existed on the territory of the Bukhara Emirate (26 cells, 300 members of the party). The BKP was supported by the Communist Party of Turkestan. By 1920, this party had become significantly stronger, receiving continued support from the RSFSR.

Initially, the relationships between the Turkburo of the Revolutionary Young Bukharians (led by Fayzulla Khodzhaev), which was created in January 1920, and the BKP were strung, and sometimes directly hostile, which was often caused by personal dislike of individual Bukhara communists towards Khodzhaev. But during the debates at the IV Congress of the BCP on August 16–19, the tactics of the two parties were agreed at Chardjui, as well as the postponement of the merger of the Turkburo with the BCP.

=== Frunze talks with the Emir ===
In the summer of 1920, the commander-in-chief of the Red Army Turkestan Front, Mikhail Frunze, tried to hold talks with the Emir of Bukhara. Frunze’s demands were unacceptable to the Emir, and the negotiations ended without result. The Red Army began to prepare for the march on Bukhara, and the Emir was getting ready for its defense.

=== Preparations for the assault of Bukhara and the assault ===
After the Chardjui congress, both the Communists and the Young Bukharians were actively preparing for an armed uprising. Chardjui and the surrounding area was also chosen as the place of the beginning of the uprising, where, as revolutionaries believed, the Dekhkans (farmers) were experiencing the greatest oppression by the Emir authorities.

The revolution started with the uprising on August 27, 1920. On the first of September, Old Chardjui was taken without a fight. On September 2, at the call of the insurgents, units of the Red Army arrived. Old Bukhara, which had high and powerful walls and a significant garrison, was taken after a 26-hour battle. During the assault of the Ark of Bukhara, the fortress of the Emir, the brick 4 meters thick walls were heavily shot at by the field artillery of the Red Army, but to no avail. Airplanes were called in, and then it was possible to set fire to the palace from above, which led to its surrender.

=== The Establishment of BPSR ===
After the capture of Bukhara by the Red Army and the troops of Bukhara revolutionaries, the Communist Party of Bukhara and the Young Bukharians who joined it came to power. The Bukhara People’s Soviet Republic (BPSR) was formed a few months later at a congress of representatives of the peoples of Bukhara.

At the same time, the Basmachi movement was organized, which opposed the revolutionary Bukhara. The country was plunged into civil war.

== Basmachi ==
=== Occupation of Dushanbe by Enver-Pasha in 1922 ===
The leadership of the Red Army underestimated Enver Pasha’s forces and began to prepare for the withdrawal of Russian troops from Eastern Bukhara that were to be replaced by Bukhara troops. In the fall of 1921, the Chairman of the CEC Abdulkadyr Mukhiddinov was dispatched to Eastern Bukhara. Usman Hodzha began to demand speeding up the withdrawal of Russian troops, and a conflict arose with representatives of the RSFSR in Dushanbe. In December 1921, Usman Hodzha arrested the command of the garrison of Dushanbe together with the consul of the RSFSR and disarmed part of the Dushanbe garrison. During the armed conflict, the Russian garrison was able to release the detainees and call for help of the Russian troops from Baysun over the radio. Usman Hodzha's troops retreated south into the mountains of Babatag, where the Basmachis of Enver Pasha attacked him. Part of the Bukharians surrendered, another part returned to Dushanbe. Pulat Khodjaev and Ali-Riza fled to Afghanistan. As a result, the Red Army commanders, who didn't understand the situation, arrested the leaders of the BPR in Eastern Bukhara, losing all support in the region.

By the beginning of 1922, Enver Pasha was able to unite the Basmachi troops and received weapons from Afghanistan. Squads from Afghanistan and Fergana came to his aid. By the end of December 1921, Enver Pasha laid siege to Dushanbe. The garrison of the city withstood a two-month siege, but in February 1922 was able to break out from Dushanbe to Baysun.

=== Enver Pasha's campaign in Bukhara ===
Enver Pasha’s campaign in Bukhara was a series of battles fought between the Basmachi movement—led by Enver Pasha and Molla Abduk Kakhar—and Soviet forces during April and May of 1922. The campaign resulted in an overall victory for the Basmachi, with Enver Pasha successfully capturing much of Eastern Bukhara as well as significant parts of Western Bukhara. This advance temporarily disrupted Soviet control in the region and bolstered the anti-Bolshevik resistance, although the conflict would continue with renewed Soviet efforts later that year.

== Strengthening of Soviet power and liquidation of the Bukhara Republic ==
Despite Soviet military victories, they couldn't completely destroy the Basmachi. Due to this, the Bukhara Republic became the first country in the East where a policy of national reconciliation began to be implemented. This took the form of a general amnesty for the population that was forced to flee due to the Basmachi, renunciation of armed struggle and bloodshed in relations with the Basmachi, and most importantly, respect for Islam. These actions created tangible results. By February 1923, 300 bandits and 17 leaders of said bandits ended their resistance and laid down their arms. However, despite the successes achieved, the existence of the Bukhara People's Republic was short-lived. In September 1924, the V All-Bukhara Kurultai of the BNSR Councils made the following decision:

"The Bukhara People's Soviet Republic is declared the Bukhara Soviet Socialist Republic. Expressing the will of the peoples of Bukhara, we declare our consent to form, together with the Uzbeks of Turkestan and Khorezm, the Uzbek Soviet Socialist Republic... The Kurultai decisively establishes the need for Uzbekistan... to join the CCCP."

Thereby ending the Bukhara People's Soviet Republic and incorporating it into the Union of Soviet Socialist Republics, de facto ending the Bukharan Revolution in a victory for the Bolshevik factions.
