= Muhiddin Mansurov =

Tajik merchant, banker and politician

- Born: Bukhara, Uzbekistan
- Died: Moscow, Russian Soviet Federative Socialist Republic
- Citizenship: Emirate of Bukhara; Bukharan People's Soviet Republic; Soviet Union
- Occupations: merchant, banker
- Children: Isom, Abdulkadir, Amin, Khairullo, and Matlabkhan
- Awards: Order of the Red Star Bukhara Soviet Republic, 1st class

Muhiddin Mansurov was a merchant from Bukhara, public figure and statesman, one of the leaders of the Jadid movement in Bukhara and the "Young Bukharans" movement.

== Biography ==
Muhiddin Mansurov was Tajik by nationality. He was born into a noble family and was a banker, and the owner of a large cotton gin. Before the October Revolution, Mansurov was one of the richest people of Bukhara, a member and patron of the Jadidist movement. Since 1900, he has been in opposition to the Bukhara emir. Mansurov was the owner and one of the founders of the Tajik-language newspaper "Bukharaye Sharif", founded in 1912. In 1917, Mansurov became the chairman of the "Young Bukhara" movement. In 1918, he fled from the pursuit of the Bukhara emir and hid in the cities of New Bukhara (now Kogon) and Tashkent. Also, his sons Isom Muhiddinov and Abdulkadir Muhiddinov were accepted into the Central Committee of the movement. After the dissolution of the Emirate of Bukhara and the declaration of the Bukhara People's Soviet Republic, in 1920 Mansurov headed the USSR mission in Moscow to establish trade and political relations with Soviet Russia. In 1920–1921, trade and industry inspector (minister) of the Bukhara People's Soviet Republic. In 1922, he became a member of the Presidium of the All-Bukhara MIQ from the representatives of merchants. Muhyiddin Mansurov was the chairman of the Bukhara Economic Council from March 1921 to April 1923.

== Family ==
Mansurov married a woman from a noble family. Mansurov had four sons and one daughter: Isom, Abdulkadir, Amin, Khairullo Muhiddinovlar and Matlabkhan Muhiddinova. His sons Isom, Abdulkadir, Amin were members of the "Young Bukhara" movement, besides, Isom managed his father's business and the "Mansurov Trading House", Abduqadir later became the chairman of the USSR, and Amin worked as an authorized representative of the USSR in the RSFSR.

== See also ==
- Abdurauf Fitrat
- Fayzulla Xoʻjayev
- Young Bukharans
