= Tashkent rebellion (1917) =

Pro-soviet revolution in Tashkent

- Part of Russian Civil War
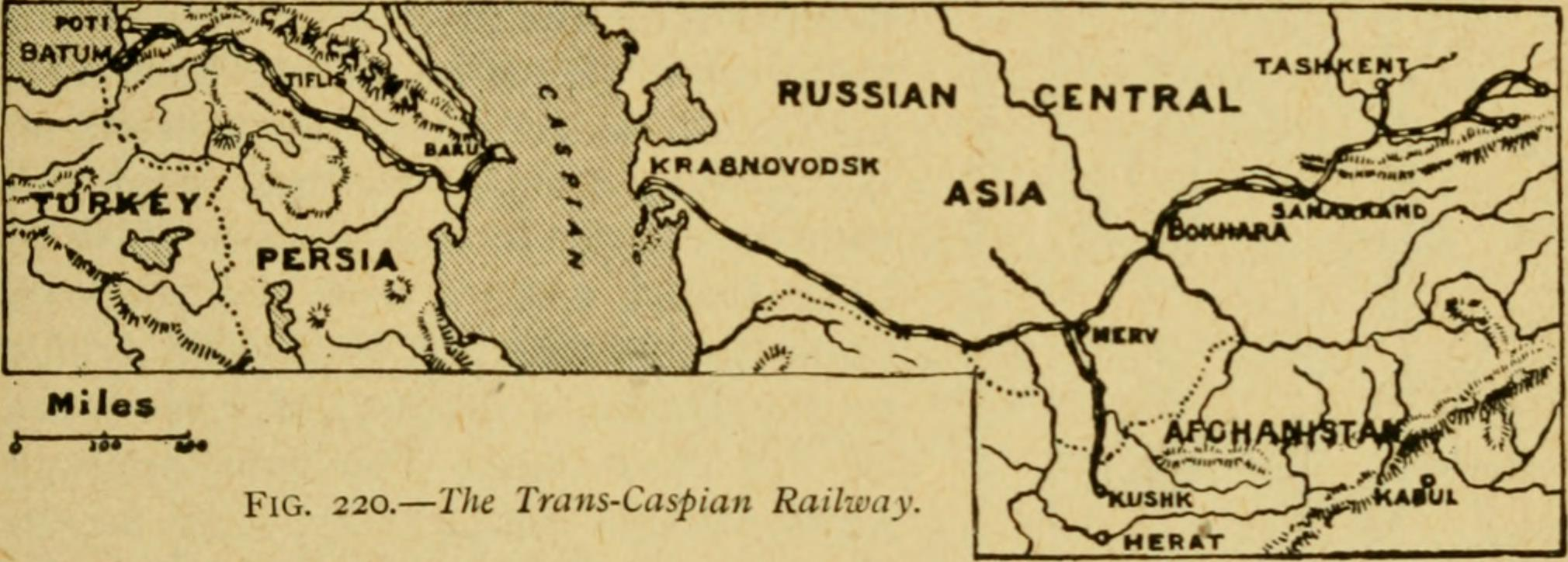
- Map of Tashkent and surrounding area, created c. 1916
| Date | September 1917 – 13 November 1917 [O.S. September 1917 – 31 October 1917] |
| Location | Tashkent, Russian Empire (now Uzbekistan) 41°18′40″N 69°16′47″E |
| Result | Far-left victory: Tashkent falls under soviet control. |

Belligerents
| Far-left factions: Socialist Revolutionaries; Russian Social Democratic Labour Party; Mensheviks; Bolsheviks; Bundists; Anarchists | State Duma loyalists Moderate left factions: Constitutional Democratic Party; Russian Social Democratic Labour Party; Russian Provisional Government: Turkestan Committee |

Commanders and leaders
| I. I. Bel'kov; G. I. Broido; I. Tobolin | Aleksey Kuropatkin; N. N. Shchepkin; Vladimir Nalivkin; I. N. Shendrikov (POW); P. A. Korovichenko (POW) |

Casualties and losses
| Unknown | About 300 arrested |

The Tashkent rebellion (September 1917 – 13 November 1917 [O.S. September 1917 – 31 October 1917]) was a 1917 conflict between revolutionary forces and loyalists of the Russian Provisional Government, which occurred in Tashkent, in what is now Uzbekistan. The events leading to the conflict began on 14 March 1917 [O.S. 1 March 1917], when local leader Aleksey Kuropatkin received word of the February Revolution. Rule shifted to various political parties in the city, and the Tashkent Soviet was created. As time progressed, Imperial officials were replaced, the soviet gained more power, and a regional soviet was created in addition to the existing council. The Russian Provisional Government began attempting to regain control in April, but the soviets tightly restricted its efforts. Many locals rallied in support of soviet power, and in September and October, conflict began between the parties, ending on 10 October [O.S. September 27].

In early November [O.S. late October], the Provisional Government fell, and loyalists attempted to disarm and imprison rebels, with partial success. The loyalists opened artillery fire on 13 November [O.S. 31 October], however a group under a white flag convinced them to cease fighting. Rebels captured the fortress that night, arresting all loyalist leaders and cadets residing there. In the aftermath, the soviet was represented entirely by Bolsheviks, in spite of their limited role in the rebellion itself. Some Muslims and Turkic peoples in the surrounding areas resisted soviet control, but the region would nonetheless become the Turkestan Autonomous Soviet Socialist Republic.

== Background ==
Tashkent—in present-day Uzbekistan—was conquered by the Russian Empire in 1865, during a period of Russian expansion throughout Central Asia. It was officially annexed the following year, by Tsar Alexander II, planned as the administrative centre of Russia's recently conquered lands. Russian settlers began arriving soon after, creating their own quarter of the city in which to reside.

== Prelude ==
The Russian Empire ceased control of Tashkent on 14 March 1917 [O.S. 1 March 1917], when Governor-General Aleksey Kuropatkin learned of the February Revolution via telegram, and there was no official opposition, as tsarist officials were permitted to cede their authority to the new government without breaking their oaths. Kuropatkin did not want to immediately announce these developments, however employees of the telegraph service spread the news to the general population. The existing political parties included the Constitutional Democratic Party, the Socialist Revolutionaries, and in much smaller numbers, the Russian Social Democratic Labour Party, although none were able to immediately take control. While later Soviet historians often emphasise the role of the Bolsheviks, most members of the Social Democratic Labour Party belonged to the Menshevik faction, and even combined, there were so few Social Democrats in total that they had to collaborate with the Socialist Revolutionaries, anarchists, Bundists, and other groups.

These factions formed a local soviet of workers' deputies, which elected delegates on 15 March 1917 [O.S. 2 March 1917] and held its first meeting on 16 March 1917 [O.S. 3 March 1917] March, appointing a Menshevik, an I. I. Bel'kov, as its chairman. The next day, another Menshevik, a G. I. Broido, created a soviet of soldiers' deputies. The former body, which held moderate views, included officers, government officials, and merchants, while the latter, with 120 members in total, included almost 60 army officers. Both were headquartered at a public meeting hall. The two merged on 10 April 1917 [O.S. 28 March 1917] into a single Tashkent Soviet, with Bel'kov as their chairman.

More moderate groups formed a local provisional government, in the building that had previously held the city's local duma. Their first meeting occurred on 4 March, attended by 250 people, mostly Constitutional Democrats, although all twenty attending railroad employees were Social Democrats. On 18 March 1917 [O.S. 5 March 1917], Kuropatkin read Nicholas II's manifesto of abdication at a town meeting in Cathedral Square, as well as Grand Duke Michael's renunciation of the throne and a message from Georgy Lvov. Kuropatkin asked them to pledge their loyalty to the State Duma, work toward a military victory, and maintain public order. This dissatisfied local socialists, and on 13 April 1917 [O.S. 31 March 1917], his own guards arrested him, and from there he was sent to Petrograd. A new commander was elected for the Turkestan Military District, Colonel Leonty Nikolaevich Cherkes, who would later attain the rank of Major General. This marked the beginning of a leftward political shift.

The pro-soviet forces were at an advantage, aided by the removal of former leaders and military administrators from office. A local food crisis, a result of a bad crop and distributional issues, was too severe for the local duma to deal with, so the soviet began overseeing food distribution, gradually gaining more governmental power. During 20–28 April 1917 [O.S. 7–15 April 1917], the First Regional Congress of Workers' and Soldiers' Deputies met in the city to form a regional soviet, which was relatively moderate in nature. It shared power with the Executive Committee of the Tashkent Soviet in the city of Tashkent, although it had greater control over the rest of Turkestan. Both replaced Imperial officials with pro-soviet counterparts and worked to provide soviet administration to the region.

In mid-April (O.S.), representatives for the Russian Provisional Government arrived in the city to restore authority, not granting recognition to the soviet government. They appointed a Turkestan Committee in Petrograd, with an N. N. Shchepkin as its chairman and an additional four Russian and four Muslim members. Several were former State Duma members, and several were also Constitutional Democrats or Constitutional Democrat–inclined. Each time the committee attempted to gain support or carry out administrative tasks, the soviet government questioned the legality or attempted to counter the efforts. Shchepkin appealed for recall after weeks of the ordeal. Two new officials were selected, considered to be more left-wing: Vladimir Nalivkin and an I. N. Shendrikov. Despite Nalivkin and Shendrikov's efforts, the two soviets maintained their authority, and the Provisional Government could not undertake any actions without their permission.

In April (O.S.), the left's power grew as banished revolutionaries, including Social Democrats and Social Revolutionaries, who had been exiled in 1907–1909 began to return. At a 4–10 July [O.S. 21–27 June] meeting of the regional Russian Social Democratic Labour Party, out of thirty-one individuals with the right to vote, twenty-four were Mensheviks and seven were Bolsheviks. In early July, soldiers, sailors, and mobs attempted to seize power, and days later, a conference held by representatives for regional soviets and socialist parties encouraged that all power be given to the Provisional Government. However, amongst Social Democrats, pro-soviet sentiment increased and Menshevik influence declined, and on 3 August 1917 [O.S. 21 July 1917], the local Social Democrats voted to adopt the slogan "All power to the soviets". Despite this, the Tashkent Soviet itself did not support taking power into its own hands.

== Rebellion ==
The Turkestan Committee was aware of the severity of the situation in Tashkent, and attempted to dispatch a commissar general to the region, but in late August, this was cut short by the Kornilov affair, which strengthened the revolutionary movement. The regional soviet tried several officers for speaking favourably about Lavr Kornilov, and 5,000 railroad workers met to demand that power be given to the soviets. Rumours among Russians that native populations were hoarding food as the shortage grew more severe on 22 September [O.S. 9 September], when indigenous people from surrounding areas arrived in Tashkent to purchase food for the approaching Muslim holidays. On 24 September [O.S. 11 September], soldiers from the First Siberian Regiment searched natives on a train for food, confiscating what they found. On the 25th [O.S. 12th], thousands gathered in a local park, electing a presidium headed by an I. Tobolin, a Bolshevik. The Revolutionary Committee was formed, demanding the soviets take power, with five Bolsheviks—including Tobolin as chairman, two Mensheviks, five Socialist Revolutionaries, and two anarchists. This move upset both the regional soviet and the Provisional Government, and General Cherkes mobilised cadets from the military school to arrest most of the committee. Under threat of armed retribution by the First and Second Siberian Regiments, the prisoners were released. General Cherkes and the cadets were arrested, and the regional soviet was dissolved. At night on 27 September [O.S. 14 September], its members fled to Skobelev, a more loyal town.

A new, more radical committee was elected by the Tashkent Soviet on 28 September [O.S. 15 September], and the next day, before they had taken any action, Nalivkin, the head of the Turkestan Committee received orders from Alexander Kerensky to free all arrested by the Revolutionary Committee and to restore order, using force if needed. The Committee managed to free and arm the cadets, and amass a total force of 900, stationed at the local fortress and throughout all government buildings in the city. The recently appointed Commissar General P. A. Korovichenko was on his way to Tashkent by 2 October [O.S. 19 September], leading a punitive expedition. The soviet demanded that it be recalled, the refusal of which led to a general strike. The Turkestan Committee declared martial law, its reinforcements arriving with Korovichenko on 7 October [O.S. 24 September].

Korovichenko promised to end martial law if the strike ended, to which the strikers agreed on 10 October [O.S. September 27]. In terms of suppression of rebellious sentiment, Korovichenko was largely ineffective overall, as he was inclined toward nonviolent measures, such as not disarming rebellious members of the garrison and believing negotiation was a valid alternative. He also ignored advice given to him by those under him and removed Nalivkin from his position as head of the Turkestan Committee. Left-wing parties met again at the Second Extraordinary Regional Congress of Workers' and Soldiers' Deputies from 12 to 23 October [O.S. 29 September to 10 October], and moderates failed to convince the congress to condemn the disbanded Revolutionary Committee, walking out in response. Now populated mostly by extremists, led by the Bolsheviks, the congress took over the activities of the regional soviet, calling again for all power to the soviets. Concurrently, Korovichenko tried to expel rebellious units from the city, some of which were his own troops, with partial success. On the night of 31 October–1 November [O.S. 18–19 October], an opposing artillery company in the fortress ignored his orders to disarm, causing loyalist troops to fire at them with machine guns. None were killed, but the group surrendered. This event harmed Korovichenko's reputation among workers and townspeople. The Provisional Government fell days later, with Korovichenko receiving the news on the 9 November [O.S. 27 October]. Martial law was again declared, and the disarming of rebellious units was ordered, as well as the arrests of all leaders of the rebellion in September. The loyalists were able to disarm the First Siberian Regiment but failed to do so to the Second Siberian Regiment, which had been warned in advance.

The rebels amassed a force of 3,000, which included German and Hungarian prisoners of war, and successfully disarmed three sotnias of loyal Cossacks. A new Revolutionary Committee was formed on the 10th of November [O.S. 28th of October], with more rebel forces arriving the following two nights, although the rebels had already possessed a numerical advantage. Korovichenko finally permitted artillery fire from the fortress on the railroad repair shops on 13 November [O.S. 31 October], but stopped when a party flying a white flag and a carrying cross from a church approached. They declared that peace needed to be found. Despite being advised otherwise, Korovichenko consented. The gates opened later in the night, and the rebels took control of the fortress. Despite their agreement otherwise, the rebels arrested all leaders and cadets present, including Korovichenko and Shendrikov, a total of about 300. Some were executed, and loyalists were hunted down in the aftermath, as power shifted to the soviets.

== Aftermath ==
The new representative body created in the aftermath of the rebellion was populated entirely by Bolsheviks. In the time following their victory, Orenburg Cossacks sabotaged the railway between Tashkent and Moscow, attempting to keep food from Tashkent and isolate it from European Russia, which was now under the control of Vladimir Lenin and the Bolsheviks. The Semirechye Oblast refused to grant recognition to the Tashkent Soviet, and Samarkand's professional unions decided they would not send delegates to the city at a meeting on 14 December. The soviet declared a state of siege on 26 December. In January of the following year, the Muslim clergy of Fergana published a manifest which condemned Russians as "infidels and tyrants". They also called on their fellow Muslims to form their own federation.

The Muslim government which controlled Fergana was overthrown, but struggles continued with Bukharan Revolution, which interrupted traffic along the Trans-Caspian Railway. Although the Turkic people were a majority in the area dependedent on the railway, which stretched from Fergana to Baku, they were not the only ethnic group, and local Armenians were open to Bolshevik ideas due to their conflict with Turkic groups. By the middle of April 1918, the Bolsheviks and Tashkent Soviet had defeated all the resistance in the region, and later in May it was reorganised as the Turkestan Autonomous Soviet Socialist Republic.
