= Fayzulla Xoʻjayev house museum =

- Fayzulla Xoʻjayev uy-muzeyi
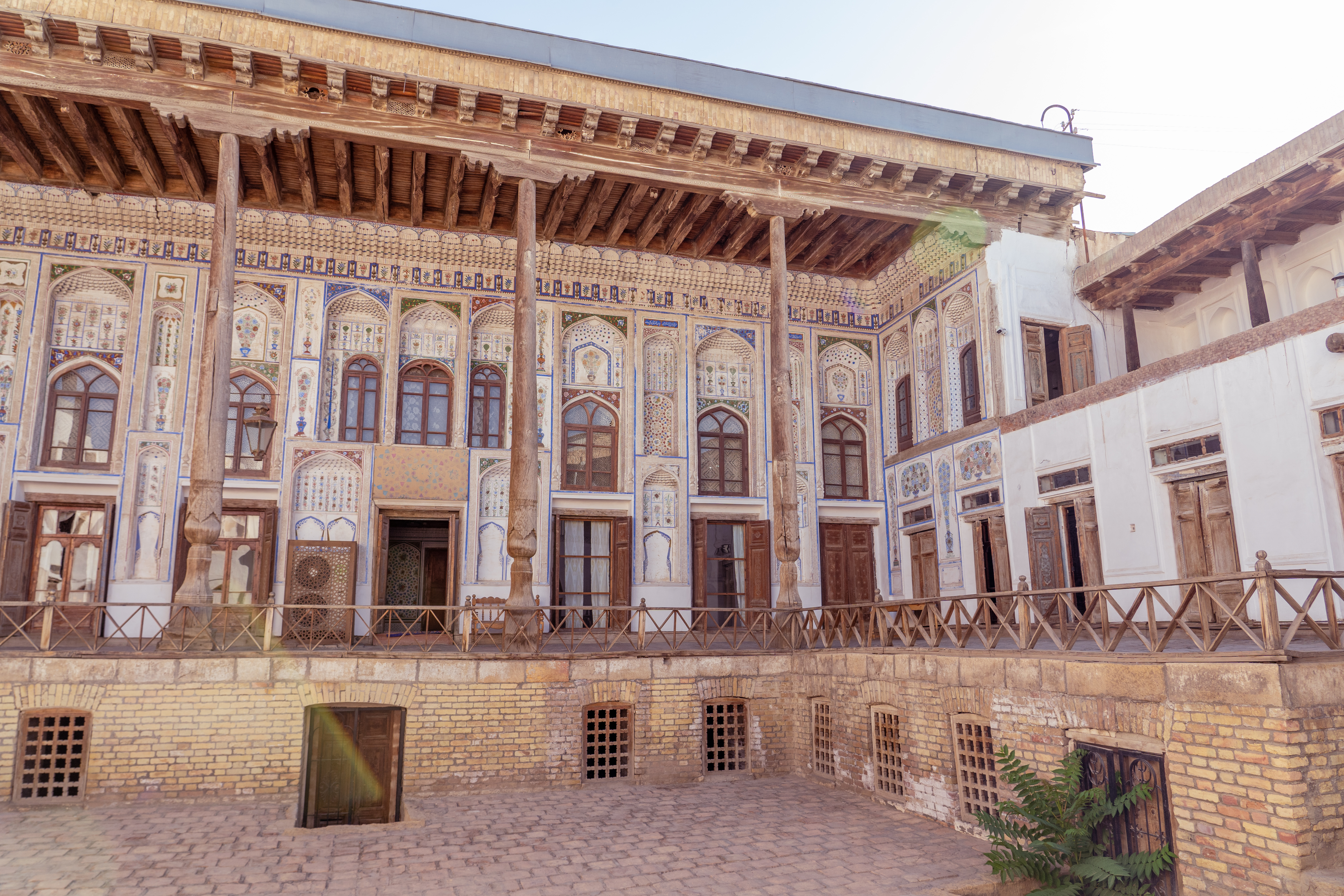
- The courtyard of the Fayzulla Khojaev House-Museum
- Interactive map of the Fayzulla Xoʻjayev house museum area
- Former names: Boy savdogar xonadoni uy-muzeyi (Rich merchant's house museum)
- Alternative names: Fayzulla Xoʻjayev memorial museum

General information
- Status: active
- Type: apartment
- Location: city center, Abdulla Tokai street, 70, Bukhara City, Uzbekistan
- Coordinates: 39.7690655°N 64.4128791°E
- Named for: Fayzulla Xoʻjayev
- Construction started: late 1880s
- Construction stopped: 2023 (restoration)
- Owner: F. Bahranov (manager)

Dimensions
- Circumference: 3 ha

Technical details
- Floor count: 2

Fayzulla Xoʻjayev house museum or Fayzulla Xoʻjayev memorial museum (Former name: Rich merchant's house museum) is a memorial building named after the politician Fayzulla Xoʻjayev located in Bukhara, Uzbekistan. The house museum is established inside the apartment. This museum is 3 hectare of land. It consists of two (Note: Some sources say it is in 3 parts. It is noted that a separate department has been allocated for the xoʻjalik (farm)) dividual inner courtyards for men and women. After Khojayev's death, this monument fell into neglect. In 2023, the house museum was reconstructed and opened for local and foreign tourists.

== List of exhibits ==
The memorial structure keeps more than 500 exhibits:

- Ethnographic exposition "Life of a rich merchant of the XIX-XX centuries";
- Exposition dedicated to the life and career of Faizulla Khojayev, a famous political figure of Uzbekistan;
- "Kitchen of a rich merchant's house" exhibition;
- "Foreign and domestic trade of Bukhara in the 19th & 20th centuries".
- Housewares from the Gardner and Kuznetsov factories of Russia in the 19th century;
- Household items made of copper and silver in Bukhara (XIX-XX centuries);
- Eastern musical instruments of the 19th century;
- Silk and velvet clothing of the Bukharis of the late 19th and early 20th centuries.

== Gallery ==
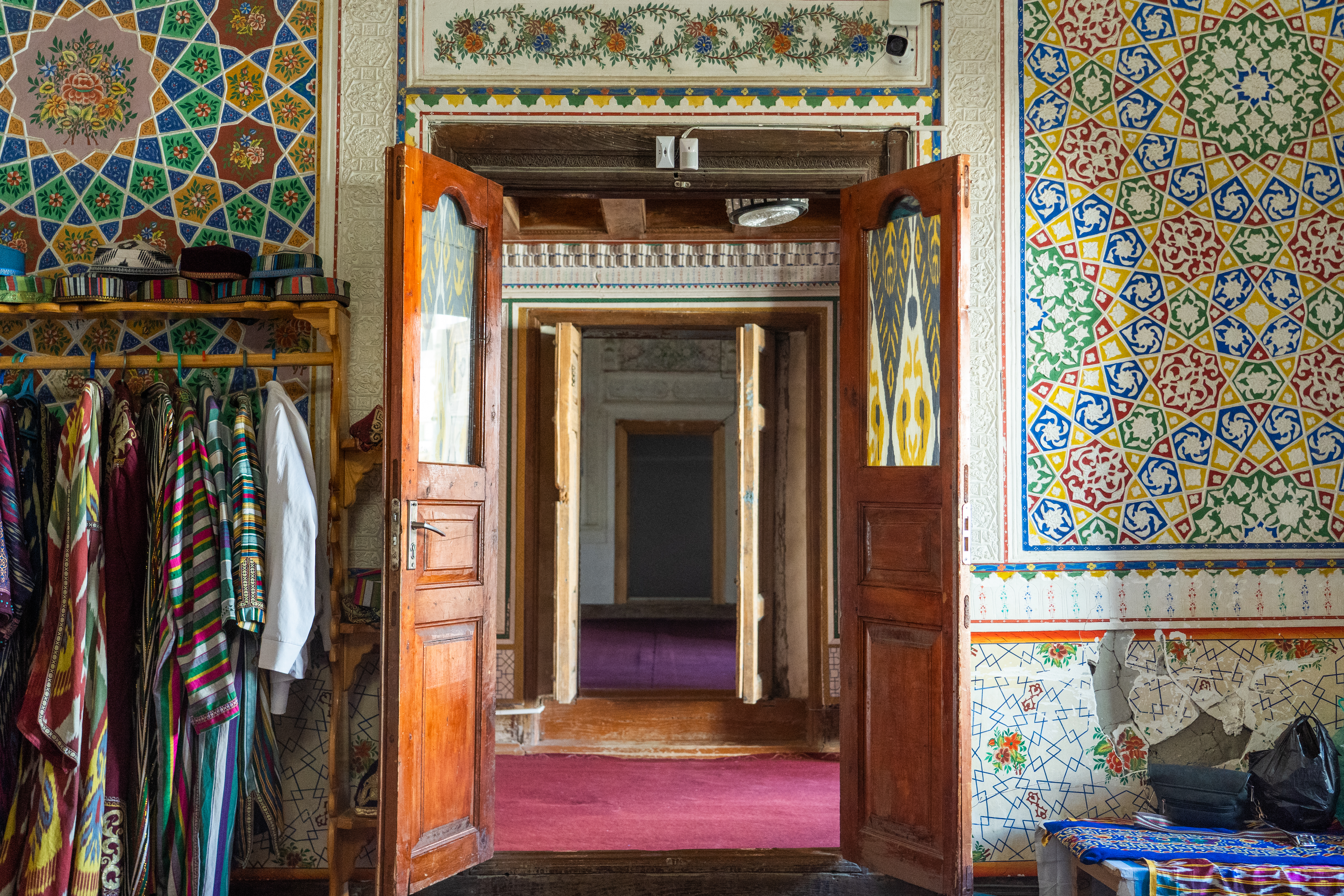
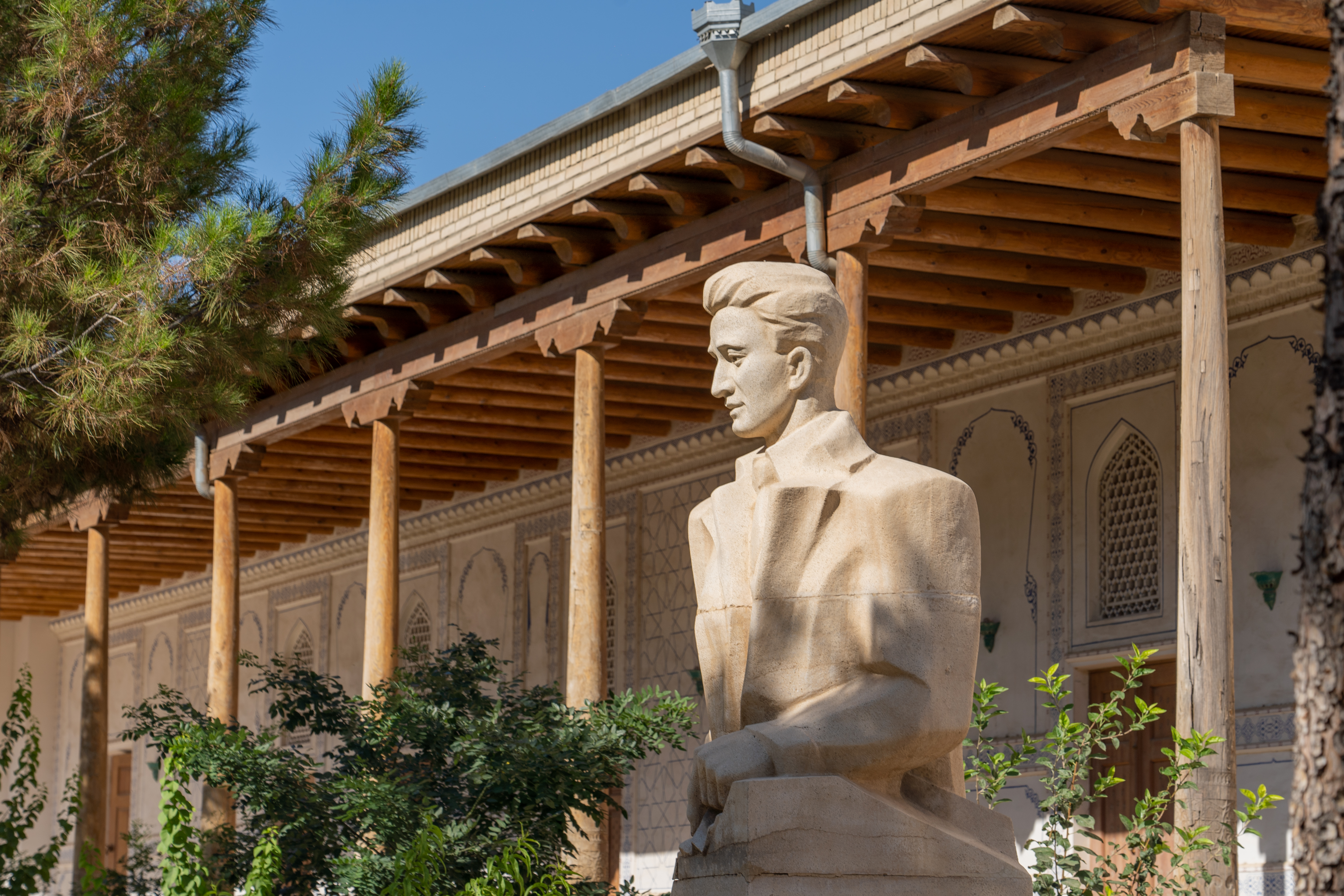
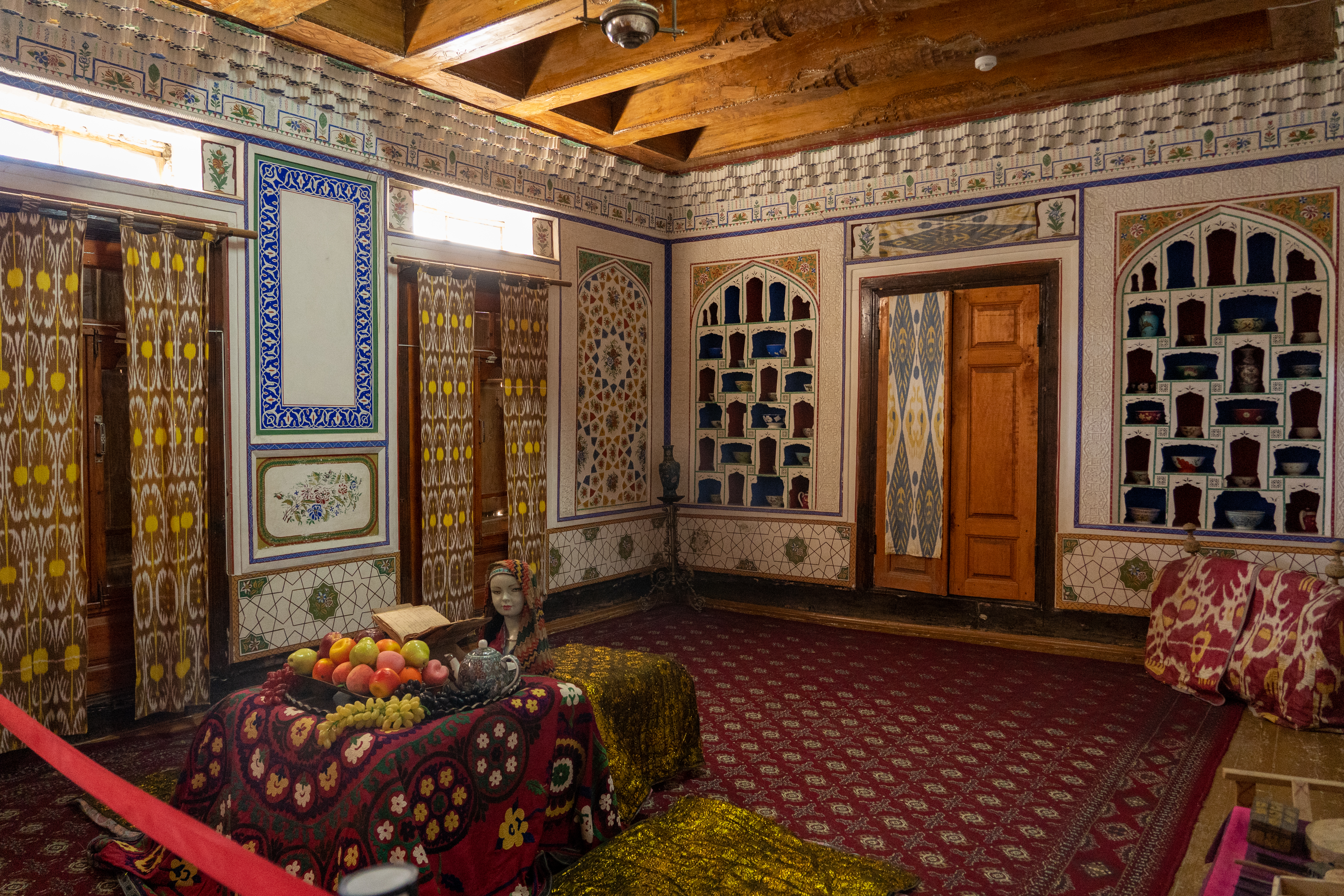
Images of Fayzulla Xoʻjayev house museum (2023)

== See also ==
- Bukhara State Architectural Art Museum-Preserve
