= Tashkent Teacher's Seminary =

Seminary in Tashkent

- Ташкентская учительская семинария
- The Church-Chapel of St. Alexander Nevsky at the Tashkent Teacher's Seminary
- Established: 1879
- Location: Tashkent, Uzbekistan; 41°31′N 69°27′E
- Language: Russian

The Tashkent Teacher's Seminary (Russian: Ташкентская учительская семинария) was a seminary in Emir Timur Square, Tashkent, established in 1879 to train teachers for local schools, including native Russian schools. Its students were mostly of Russian ethnicity, including Russian-Uzbek orientalist Mikhail Stepanovich Andreev.

== Seminary ==
The Tashkent Teacher's Seminary, initially called the Teacher's Seminary of Turkestan, opened in 1879 to train teachers in Turkestan. Most students were the children of Russian immigrants in Turkestan, and the number of students from the local indigenous population of the region was insignificant. In 1886, out of 61 students, only 9 were of local Central Asian ethnicities, and in 1883–1904, out of 254 graduates from the seminary, only 39 were of local ethnicities. After the Russian Revolution and since 1918, the school was used for preparing teachers for Soviet Uzbek schools. In 1920, the Uzbek Male Institute of Education was transformed into the Regional Uzbek Institute of Education.

Students at the seminary studied The Law of God (Orthodox Christian legal discipline), Pedagogy, the Russian language, Arithmetic, Algebra, Geometry, Physics, Natural Sciences, General History, Geography, Drawing, Calligraphy, Singing, Music, Needlework, Gymnastics, the Kazakh language, and the Persian language. Since 1884, with the efforts of Vladimir Nalivkin, the seminary began to teach the Uzbek language, which replaced Kazakh. Nalivkin was the first teacher of systematic courses on the Uzbek and Persian (Tajik) languages, compiling an anthology, dictionaries, a grammar book, and textbooks in these languages.

Initially, the seminary was located in the house of Colonel Tartakovsky, rebuilt according to the plans of Alexei Benois from 1881 to 1887. In 1887, a new building for the seminary was built in Konstantinovsky Square (Emir Timur Square). Under the Soviet Union, the building housed the City Health Department of the Tashkent Executive Committee.

== Church of St. Alexander Nevsky ==
In 1898, E. P. Dubrovin, according to a plan drawn out by Alexei Benois, built a five-domed church in the name of Saint Alexander Nevsky in the Western part of the seminary building. The Church was closed in the 1930s and its domes were demolished. However, the building itself continued to be used for various needs. After the dissolution of the Soviet Union, the building became privately owned and operated as an office building. The former church was an architectural monument and had a protected status, and it was in relatively good condition. Despite this, on the weekend of November 18 to November 21, 2009, it was demolished on the decision of city authorities in order to free up space for new construction projects. Simultaneously, trees in the old square were cut down, many of which were more than 100 years old.

== Gallery ==
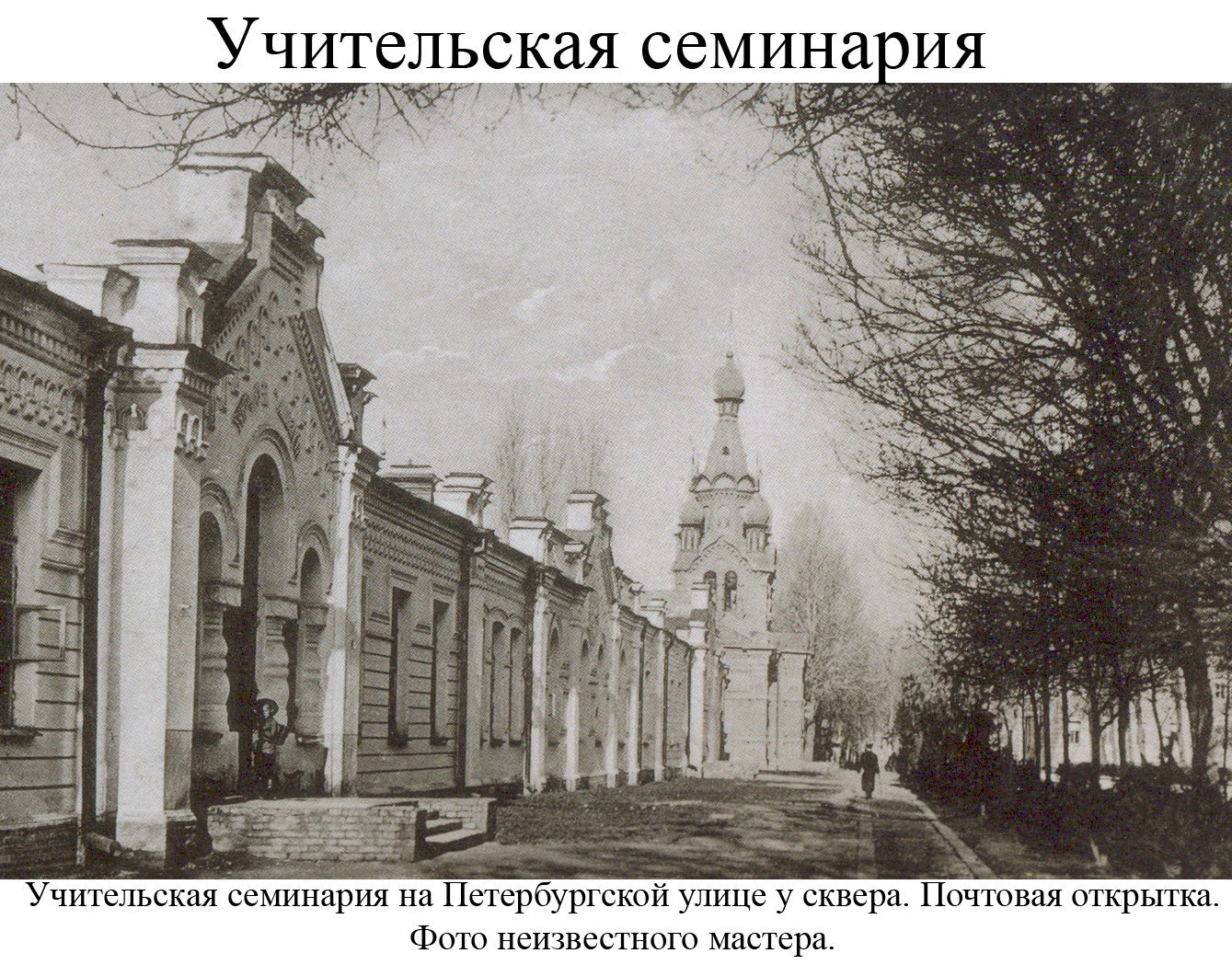
The Tashkent Teacher's Seminary

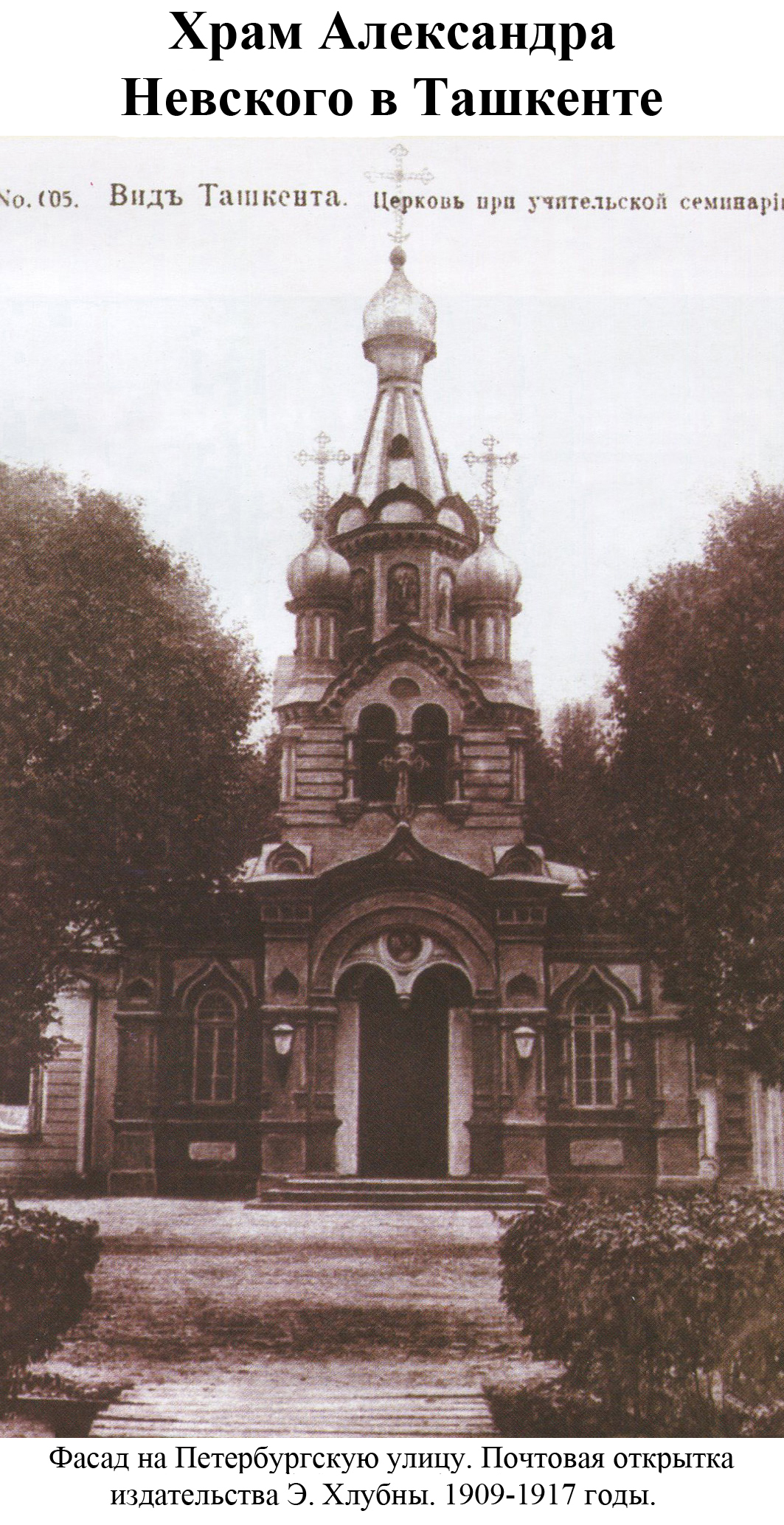
Seminary church

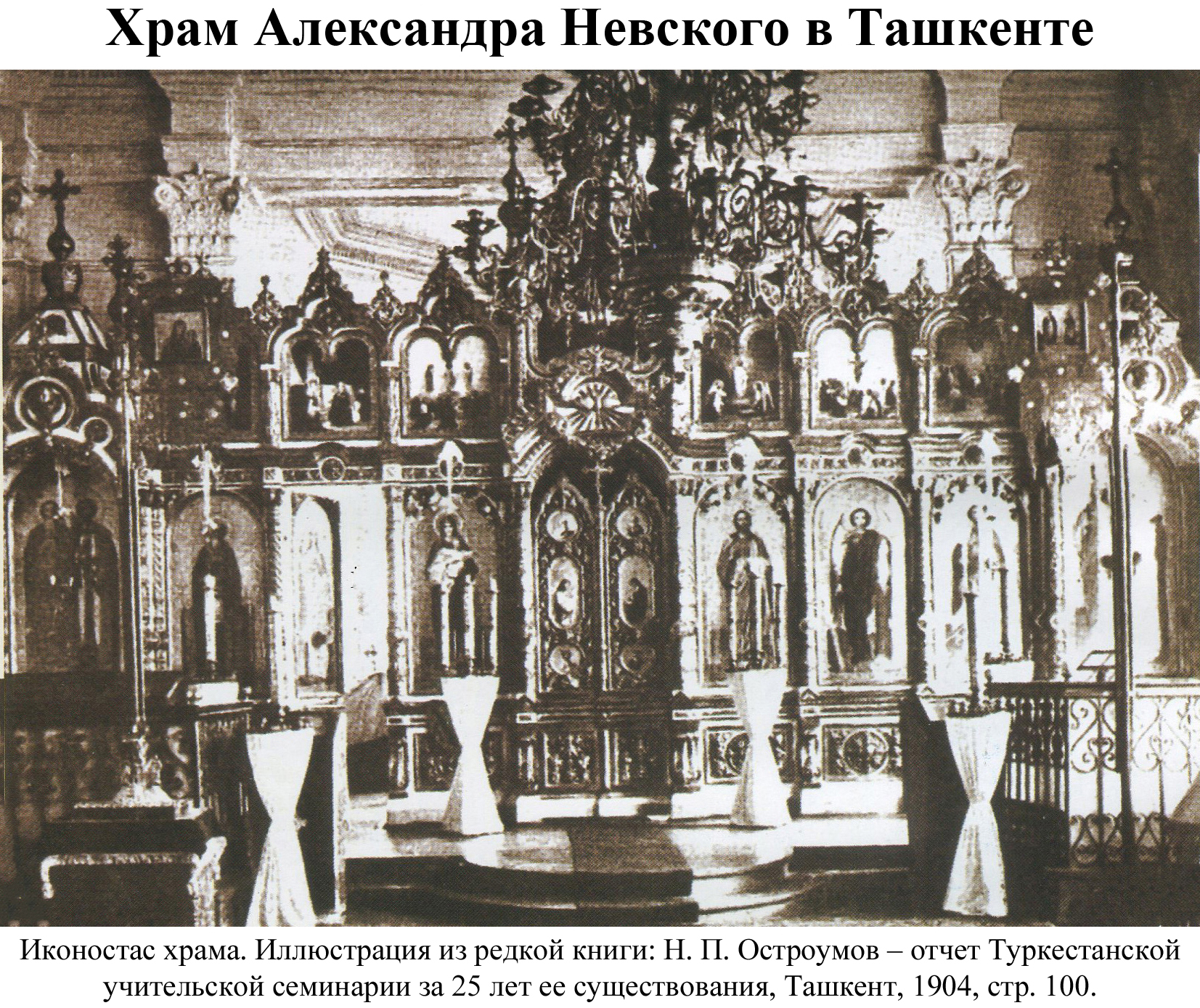
Seminary iconostasis

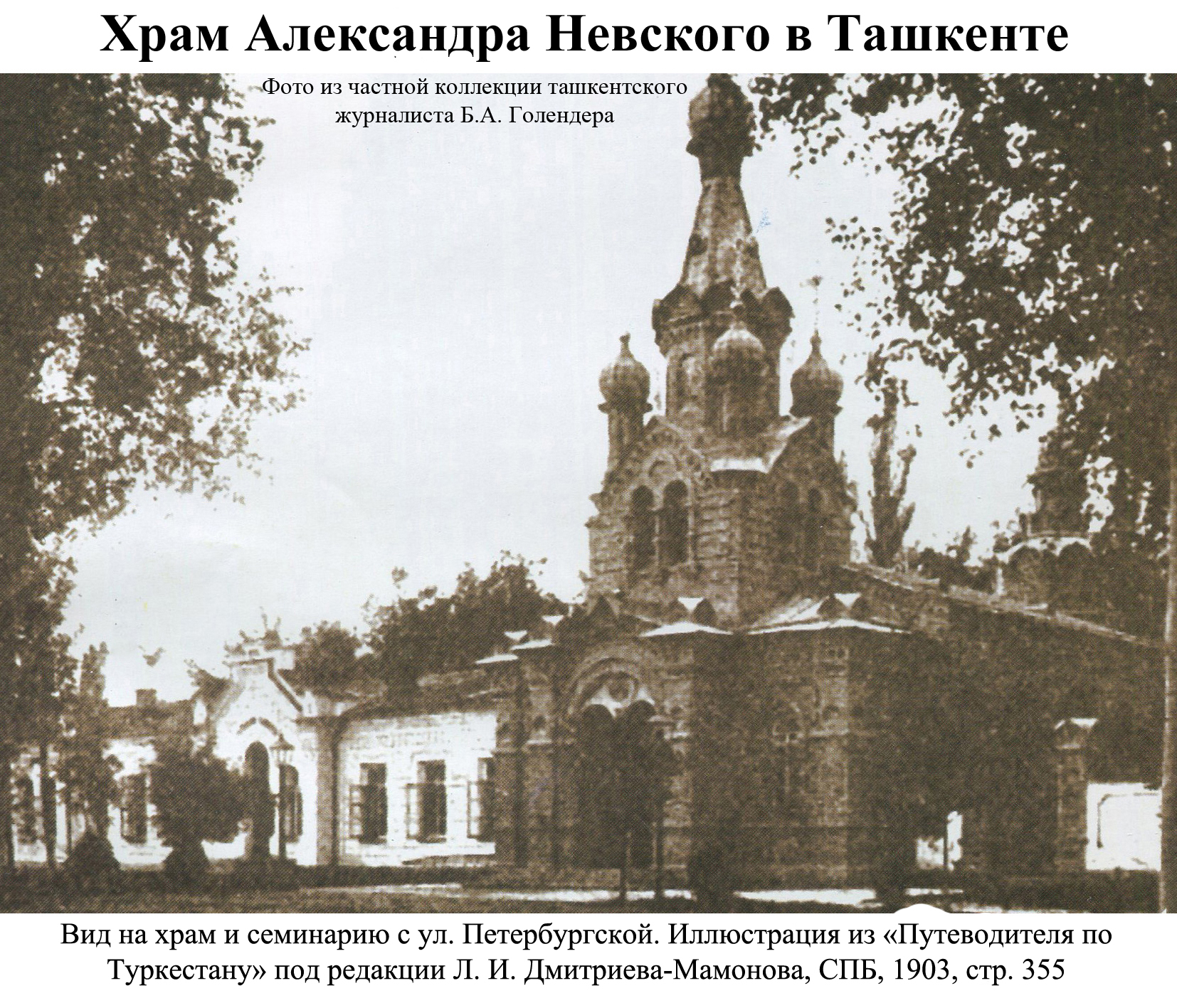
Church and teacher training seminary building

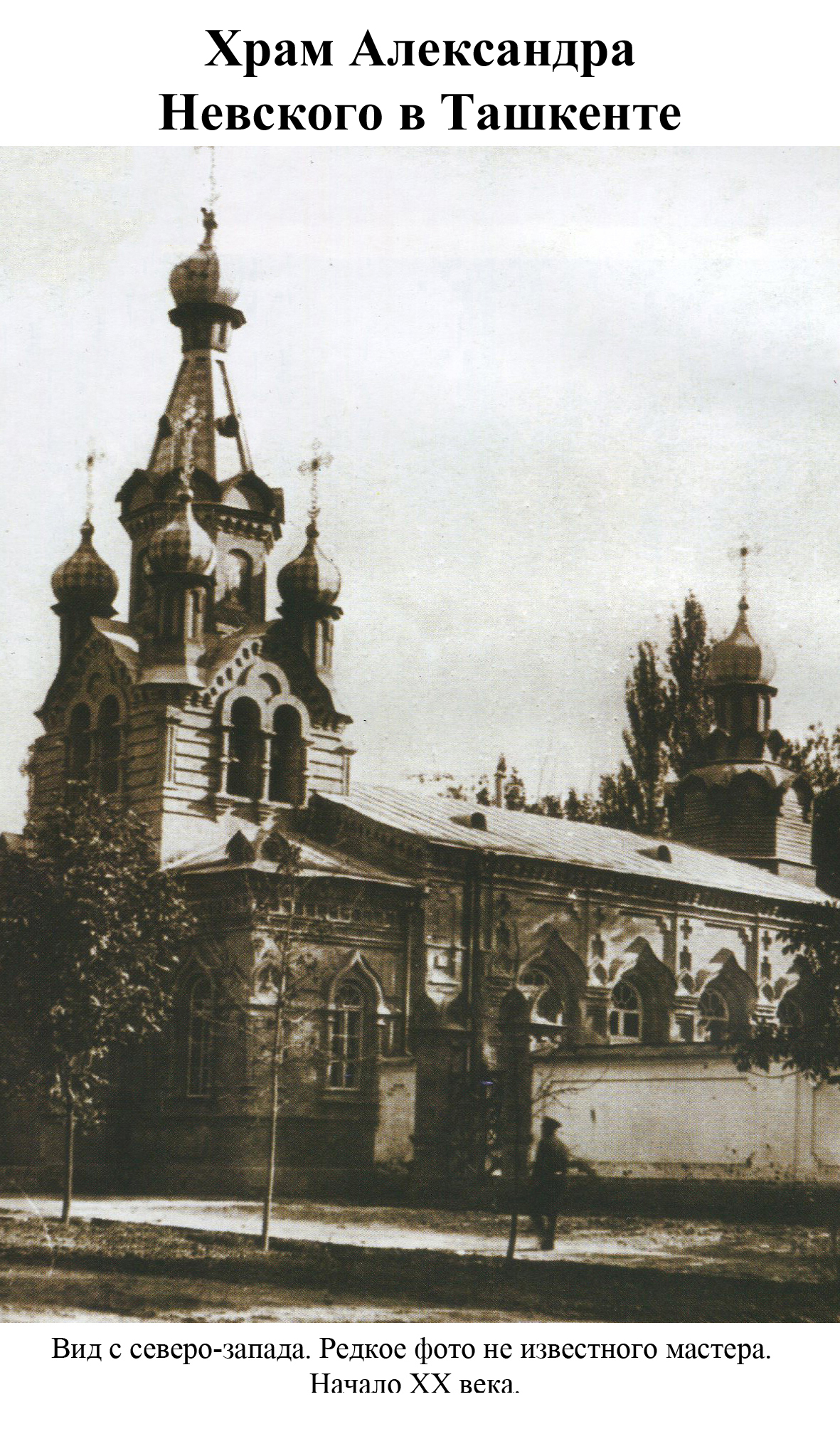
Seminary church

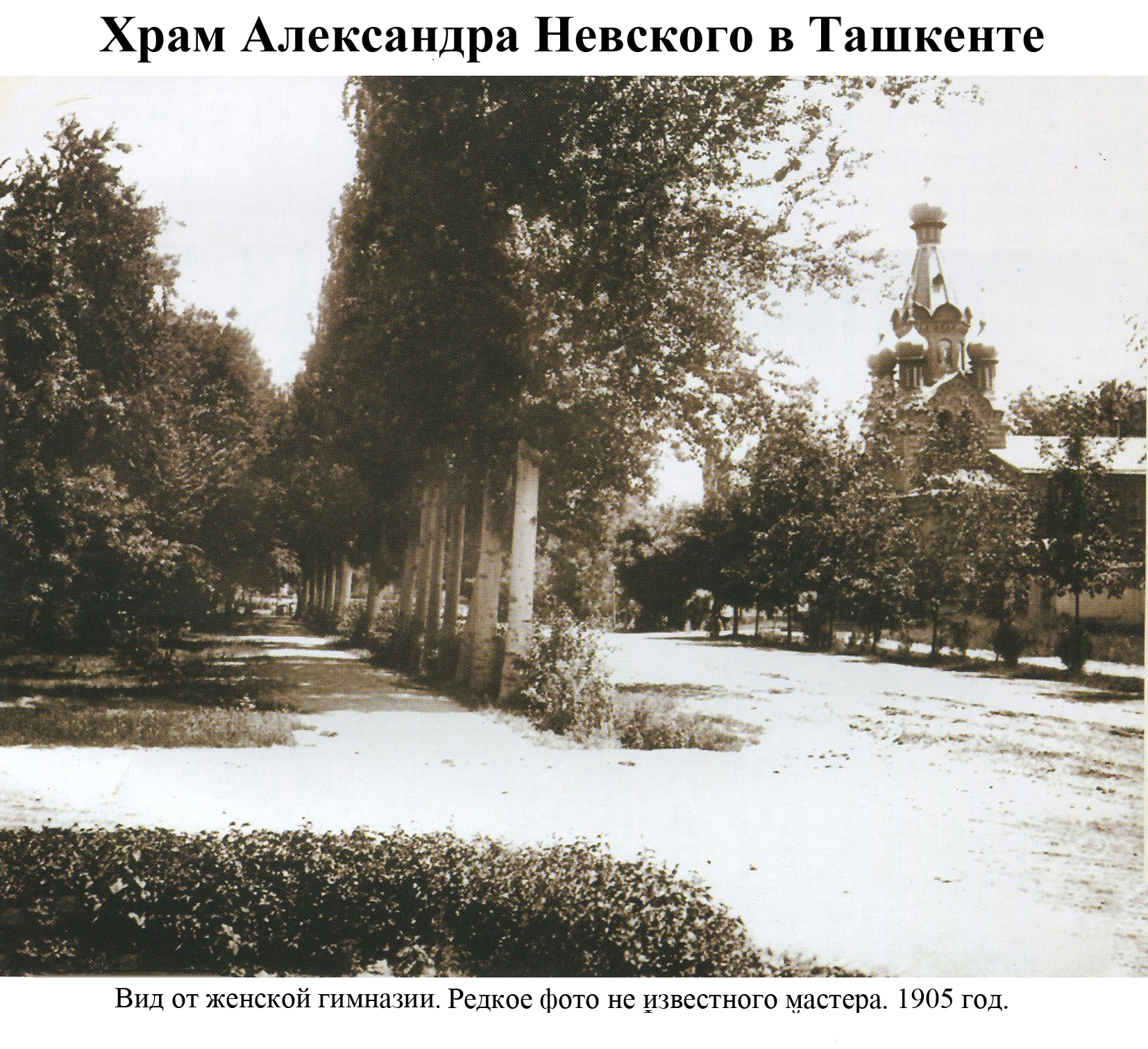
Church and teacher training seminary building
