= Mikhail Andreyev =

Russian ethnographer and linguist

- Born: Mikhail Stepanovich Andreyev; September 24, 1873; Tashkent
- Died: November 10, 1948 (Aged 75); Stalinabad (Dushanbe), Tajik SSR, Soviet Union
- Education: Tashkent Teacher's Seminary
- Occupations: Archaeologist, ethnographer, linguist
- Organization: Eastern Faculty of the First Central Asian State University
- Awards: Order of the Red Banner of Labour

Mikhail Stepanovich Andreyev (Russian: Михаи́л Степа́нович Андре́ев; September 24, 1873 - November 10, 1948) was a Russian-Uzbek and Soviet orientalist, cultural researcher of Central Asia, ethnographer, linguist, and archaeologist. He was initially supervised by Vladimir Nalivkin, and was the teacher of Olga Alexandrovna Sukhareva. He was a corresponding member of the Russian Academy of Sciences.

== Early life ==
Mikhail Stepanovich Andreyev was born in Tashkent on September 24, 1873, as the grandson of a common soldier. He studied at the Tashkent gymnasium, transferring to the Tashkent Teacher's Seminary in 1889. As a seminarist, Andreyev often visited the Tashkent old city, where he became close with some students at the madrasa there. Through these students, he met the family of Kaziy Sharif-Khoji and Ubaidulla-Maksum Mudarris of the Ishan Kuli-dodho madrasa, whom Andreyev persuaded to give him classes on Arabic, Persian, and Turkish literature. During his years of training at the seminary, Andreyev became ill and, on the advice of doctors, made trips to the mountains. When he was in Shymkent, he joined the Kyrgyz nomadic aul and went about his life with much care. In his subsequent trips to the outdoors, he frequently visited locations with good views (the upper reaches of Angren, the Ferghana Valley, Kyzylkum, the Matcha Mountains, etc.). Once, when he was visiting the Zarafshan Glacier, Andreyev returned through the Yangi-Sabak pass and subsequently traveled from Shakhrisabz to the Gissar Valley and the upper reaches of the Obihingou river to the Yaghnob River. He returned to Tashkent through Istaravshan.

== Educator ==
After graduating from the Tashkent Teacher's Seminary in 1893, Andreyev worked in Khujand as the "head of evening courses for the local population". He visited various places in Central Asia, diligently collecting archaeological and ethnographic data. In 1894, he received an invitation to work as an oriental language trainer at the Tashkent Teacher's Seminary and at the Tashkent Practical School, on whose behalf he compiled a textbook on the Uzbek language. In 1896, he wrote a guide for educators on how to teach the Persian language. He taught at the seminary from 1894 to 1896. In 1895, Andreyev's first ethnographic article was published about the remnants of pagan rites among the indigenous local population. Andreyev was a part of the Turkestan Circle of Archaeology Lovers, whom he worked with while writing his publication.

== With Alexander Polovtsov ==
In 1896, Alexander Alexandrovich Polovtsov, special assignment officer of the Ministry of the Interior of the Russian Empire, arrived in Tashkent from St. Petersburg on a mission to study the status of resettlement in Central Asia and the Caucasus. On the recommendation of an expert on the Turkestan Territory, Vladimir Nalivkin, Andreyev became Polovtsov's secretary. Andreyev accompanied Polovtsov to the Transcaspian and Transcaucasus regions and became a permanent companion and employee of Polovtsov, a person who was not devoid of scientific interests and propensity for patronage. It soon became clear that Polovtsov, who had a reputation for being a sophisticated aesthete, preferred social relations with young men (Andreyev in particular, who Polovtsov was very close to) instead of his wife, Sofia Panina, who left Polovtsov and retook her maiden name and original title.

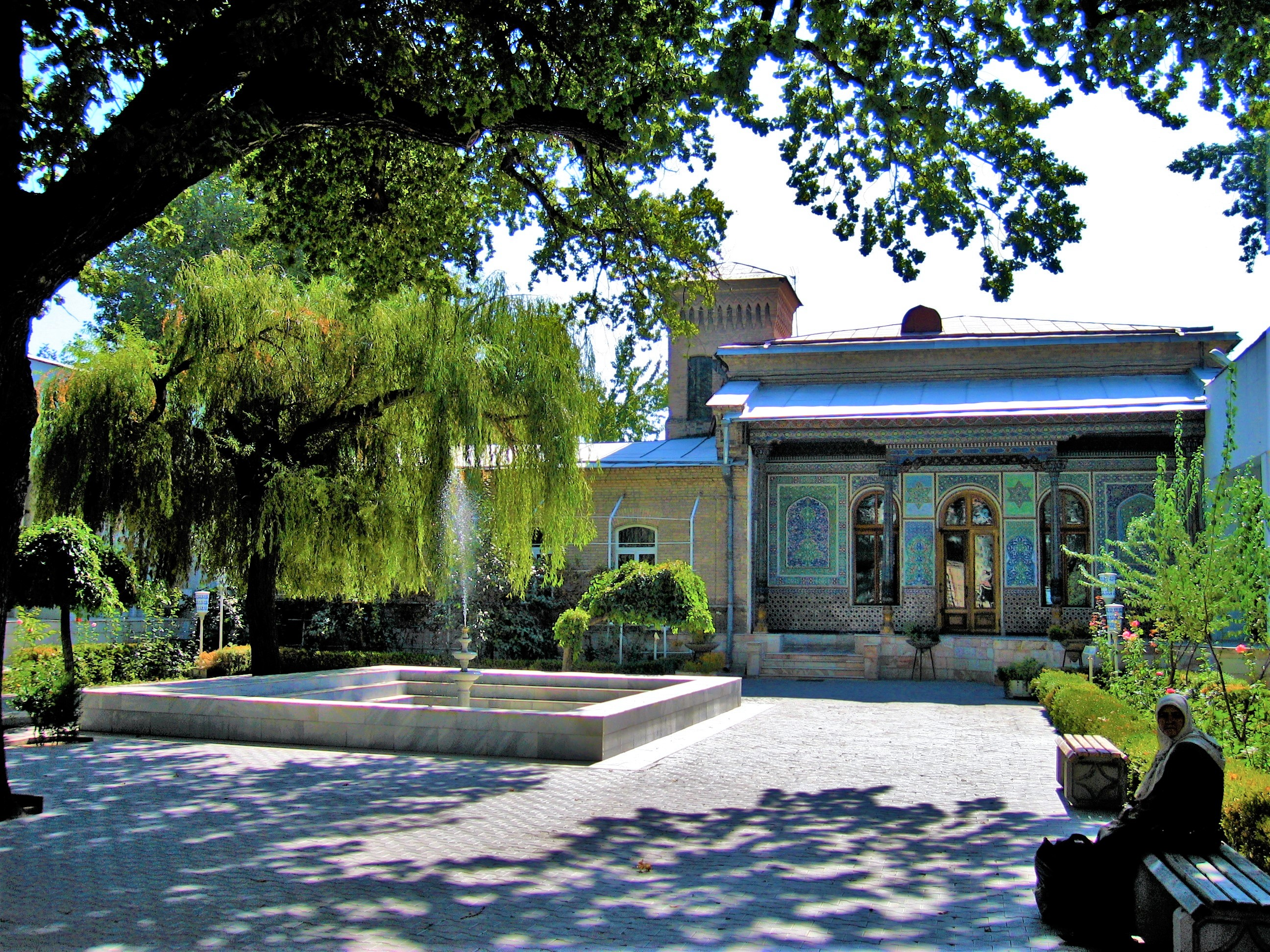
Courtyard of the Polovtsov House (now the State Museum of Applied Arts)

As Polovtsov's secretary, Andreyev bought a house for him on his behalf in Tashkent from Tashkent merchant Nikolai Ivanovich Ivanov. Andreyev restructured the house significantly in an oriental style. The architect of the restructuring was A. A. Burmeyster. The house was known in Tashkent as the "Polovtsov House". Various organizations operated out of the house, including a training center for ganch carving and embossing as well as an embroidery workshop. Since July 1937, the house housed the Handicraft Museum. Today, the house is the State Museum of Applied Arts of Uzbekistan.

With the return of Polovtsov to his permanent residence, Andreyev accepted his proposal to move to St. Petersburg, where, in connection with his scientific studies, he entered into live communication with prominent Russian orientalists such as S.F. Oldenburg, V. V. Radlov, and K. G. Zalemanom. These orientalists appreciated Andreyev's erudite nature and his devotion to science, particularly his knowledge of the languages and life of the peoples of Central Asia. Andreyev spent the winter of 1898 with Polovtsov in Paris, where they learned French. In addition to his official duties, he worked in the Eastern branch of the French National Library. However, even though he traveled and lived in many places, Andreyev never broke his ties with Central Asia, and returned many times to live in Tashkent, where he continued to collect linguistic and ethnographic data.

In 1902, Andreyev drove through Osh to the Pamirs, to Vakhan, Ishkashim and back. The result of the trip was a scientific joint publication with Polovtsov on the ethnography of the Ishkashim and Vakhan tribes. During the trip and during his stay in Tashkent after, Andreyev managed to collect data on the Yazgulyam language, which was then extremely obscure and almost unknown. In 1906, Andreyev left for India, as Polovtsov was appointed Consul-General in Bombay. The Russian Academy of Sciences instructed him to collect ethnographic data. During his stay in India, he sent a collection of 1000 exhibits to the Museum of Anthropology and Ethnography at the Academy of Sciences, as well as sending a report on British intelligence in India to the Governor-General of Turkestan. He also studied the Hindi and Pashto languages.

In 1907, during a vacation, Andreyev again arrived in Central Asia, where he walked on foot with Polovtsov from Kashgar, through the Himalayas, along the Karakorum pass to Western Tibet, and, from there, passing Yarkand, Tashkurgan, Vakhan, Shugnan and East Pamir in the Ferghana Valley. In 1911, he was elected a corresponding member of the Geographical Society of Bengal. He served as the personal translator of the Consul and Vice-Consul of Russia in India and French Indochina from 1906 to 1914.

Upon returning home to Central Asia, Andreyev was appointed inspector of public schools in the Khojent and Jizzakh counties of the Samarkand region. The Russian Geographical Society entrusted him with the task of compiling an ethnographic map of the Turkestan Territory, for which he visited the Nur-Ata Mountains and Kyzylkum, which was adjacent to it, as well as going to the Matcha Mountains in 1916.

== Under the Soviet Union ==
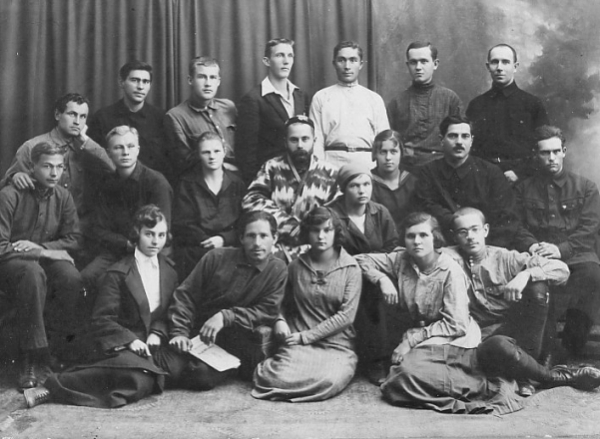
Professor of paleontology D.V. Nalivkin (center, wearing an Uzbek gown) with a group of students from the mining and geological department of the Physics and Mathematics Faculty of the Central Asian State University. In the back row, third to the left, is Vladimir Popov, future academician of the Uzbek SSR. Fourth to the left on the back row is Konstantin Sokolov. Tashkent, 1926.

The October Revolution found Andreyev in Khojand. With the establishment of Soviet power in Khojand, Andreyev was appointed Commissar of Public Education of the Khojand District. He was then called to Tashkent, where he was entrusted to organize an Oriental university. In November 1918, the Turkestan Oriental Institute opened, led by Andreyev, who was responsible for selecting teachers, organizing facilities, provisioning educational equipment, building a library, organizing archaeological and numismatic collections, as well as many other tasks. Andreyev himself taught classes in the Persian language and Tajik on the ethnography of Tajiks. His activity at the Turkestan Oriental Institute and as an assistant professor and professor at the Oriental Department of the First Central Asian State University lasted more than 20 years. He taught at the Eastern faculty of the Central Asian State University through World War II and after it. He was also, for a time, a professor in the Faculty of History, where he was in charge of the Department of Ethnography.

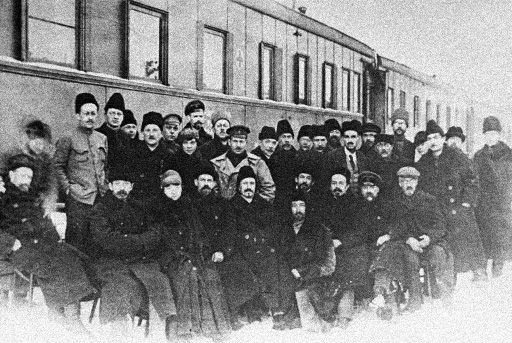
Passengers on a "science train" to work at the Central Asian State University

In 1923, Andreyev was elected as a corresponding member of the Central Bureau of Local History at the Academy of Sciences. He was awarded the gold medal of the Russian Geographical Society in 1928. During his years as a professor, Andreyev tirelessly organized various expeditions to collect and study ethnographic data and local folklore. His ethnographic collections were received at the Central Asian Central Museum in Tashkent, which was, for a time, headed by him, as well as other museums.

In 1921, Andreyev was appointed a member of the Scientific Commission for the Survey of the Life of the Indigenous Population of Turkestan under the Council of People's Commissars of the Turkestan ASSR. He led an expedition to compile an ethnographic map of the republic. In the years 1921–1922, the expedition worked in Samarkand, Kattakurgan, Jizzakh and Khojand. In 1923, Andreyev visited the headwaters of Chirchik. He visited the Matcha Mountains, Karategin, Gissar and Yaghnob in 1924. In 1925, under his leadership, the expedition operated along the route of Tashkent, Ura-Tyube, the Zarafshan River valley, Yaghnob, Anzob Pass, Dushanbe, Karategin, Darvaz, Pamirye, Pamir, and Osh. The expedition collected rich ethnographic data. Andreyev was one out of a group of scientists (I. I. Zarubin, N. G. Mallitsky, L. V. Oshanin, A. A. Semenov, and others) who carried out a great deal of work to collect preparatory materials for the implementation of the national delimitation of the peoples of Central Asia in 1924.

In 1926, Andreyev traveled to Afghanistan as a senior dragoman of the Soviet-Afghan commission of the Middle Eastern department of the USSR People's Commissariat of Internal Affairs, using his stay in the country to collect information on the language and everyday life of Tajiks in the Panjshir Valley. In 1927, Andreyev led an expedition to Yaghnob, and in 1929, he led one to theKhuf Valley. On January 31, 1929, Andreyev, per the recommendation of prominent Soviet orientalists and academicians S. F. Oldenburg, V. V. Bartold, F. I. Sherbatsky and I. Y. Krachovsky, was elected a corresponding member of the USSR Academy of Sciences Department of Humanities (in the category of Oriental Sciences (Iranian studies)).

In 1930, the Joint State Political Directorate collegium subjected Andreyev to administrative expulsion to Alma-Ata for 3 years, accusing him of being a part of a counterrevolutionary group. However, he returned to Tashkent ahead of schedule. In 1934, at the suggestion of the Council of People's Commissars of the Tajik SSR and the Central Committee of the Communist Party of Tajikistan, Andreyev carried out an expedition to the Pamir region to replenish previously collected ethnographic and linguistic data in the Khuf Valley and other valleys near it. From the end of 1934 to 1940, Andreyev also served as a consultant on the art of the peoples of Central Asia at the Museum of Art in Tashkent. In 1936, he led the Museum's ethnographic and art history expedition to Bukhara and Khiva. In 1937, another museum expedition under him went to the village of Nur-Ata and the city of Margilan.

On August 10, 1938, Andreyev was arrested and charged with espionage for British intelligence. However, he was released on June 11, 1939.

During Andreev's interrogation on May 11th, 1939, an investigator from the State Security Directorate of the NKVD of Uzbekistan asked the accused M. Andreev "Why did you send the Joint State Political Directorate board from Tashkent to Alma-Ata in 1930?" to which he replied "In 1930, on the decision of the Joint State Political Directorate college in Tashkent, among 11 people, professors and teachers of the Oriental Department of the Central Asian State University, namely Gramenitsky, Alexander A. Garritsky, Umnyakov, Violetov, Alexander Vasilyevich Pankov and others, I was expelled from Tashkent city for a period of 3 years, taking into account the time from the date of my arrest (approximately about 6 months when I was under investigation). I will add that among the deportees were Alexander Eduardovich Schmidt, Alexander Alexandrovich Semenov, Nikolay Guryevich Mallitsky and Mikhail Filipovich Gavrilov. The reasons for my expulsion I have never understood, as I did not plead guilty to my charges under Article 58 of the Criminal Code... I consider A. E. Schmidt's testimony to be completely false and I categorically deny both the existence of the group and my involvement in it, because I have never been a part of any counter-revolutionary group..."

In 1940, Andreyev organized an expedition that gathered extensive and diverse materials on the Arch of Old Bukhara. During World War II, Andreyev took part in the work of the Institute of Oriental Studies of the USSR Academy of Sciences in Tashkent as an employee of the Indian cabinet. He also participated in meetings of the Turkological and Central Asian offices in Tashkent. On November 3, 1943, Andreyev was elected a full member of the newly created Uzbek Academy of Sciences. From 1944 to 1947, Andreyev led a team of ethnographers from the Institute of History and Archaeology of the Academy of Sciences of the Uzbek SSR. In 1947, he moved to Stalinabad, where he worked on preparing the opening of the Museum of Archaeology and Ethnography.

About 50 of Andreyev's works have been published under the Turkestan Circle of Archaeology Lovers, the Society for the Study of Tajikistan and Iranian Nationalities Beyond Its Borders, the Turkestan branch of the Russian Geographical Society and others.

Andreyev died on November 10, 1948, in Stalinabad.

== Awards ==
- Order of the Red Banner of Labor (06/10/1945)
- Honored Scientist of the Tajik SSR (1944)
- Honored Scientist of the Uzbek SSR (1945)

== Works ==
- A guide for the initial teaching of the Sart language in the Tashkent real school. Tashkent, 1896;
- Andreyev M.S., A.A. Polovtsov Materials on the ethnography of Iranian tribes of Central Asia. Ishkashim and Wahan. SPb. Collection of the Museum of Anthropology and Ethnography 9. 41 p.
- Dreams of dreams, a few will be accepted by the children's game “Magpie-Crow” among some peoples, mainly Central Asia // ISKMOPSIP. 1923. Issue 2. S. 1-34;
- Wooden column in the Matcha Mountains // IRAIMK. 1925. T. 4.P. 115–118;
- Iron production in the Vancha valley (upper reaches of the Amu-Darya) . Tashkent, 1926.
- According to the Ethnology of Afghanistan. Panjshir Valley: (Materials from a trip to Afghanistan in 1926). (Society for the Study of Tajikistan and Iranian Nationalities Beyond) 101 p. Tashkent, 1927;
- Regarding the process of formation of primitive Central Asian ancient workshops and workshop legends (Risal) // Ethnography. 1927. No. 2. P. 323–326;
- A Brief Overview of Some Features of Tajik dialects: (Materials). Stalinabad; Tashkent, 1930;
- The Yazgulem Language: Tables of Verbs. L., 1930;
- On the Modern Tajik Language - In the book: Materials on the History of Tajiks in Tajikistan. Stalinabad, 1945;
- Tajiks of the Khuf Valley (upper reaches of the Amu Darya). Vol. 1–2. Stalinabad, Taj Academy of Sciences. SSR, 1953–1958. Vol. I. 1953. 247 p. [Proceedings of the Academy of Sciences of the Tajik SSR, T. 7. Materials for the Study of the culture and life of Tajiks. (Institute of History, Archeology and Ethnography of the Academy of Sciences of the Tajik SSR)]; Issue 2. Preparation for printing, note and add. A. K. Pisarchik. 1958. 521 p. (Proceedings of the Academy of Sciences of the Taj. SSR. T. I. XI);
- Yaghnob Texts. With the Application of the Yaghnob-Russian Dictionary. Comp .: M. S. Andreyev, V. A. Livshits and A. K. Pisarchik. M. — L., Academy of Sciences of the USSR, 1957.392 s. (USSR Academy of Sciences. Taj Academy of Sciences. SSR). - Authors: M. S. Andreyev and E. M. Peshcherova;
- Materials on the Ethnography of Yaghnob. (Records of 1927–1928). Dushanbe, Donish, 1970.192 p .;
- The Arch of Bukhara in the late XIX - early XX centuries. Dushanbe, 1972 (with O.D. Chekhovich).
