= Fyodor Kolesov =

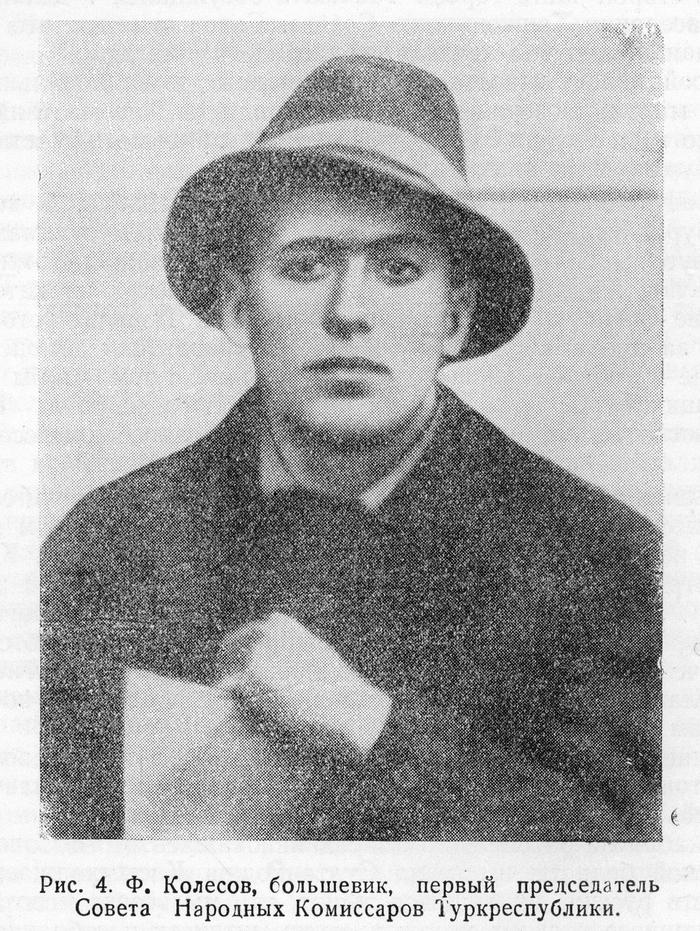
Fyodor Kolesov

Fyodor Ivanovich Kolesov (Russian: Фёдор Иванович Колесов) (Uralsk, 20 May 1891 – Moscow, 29 July 1940) was a Russian revolutionary, Soviet politician and party official, who was one of the organizers of the struggle for Soviet power in Turkestan during the Russian Revolution. He was a member of the Communist Party since 1917.

== Biography ==
Fyodor Ivanovich Kolesov was the son of an employee. He worked as a clerk on the railway in Orenburg, and from 1916 - in Tashkent. From September 1917, he was a member of the executive committee of the Tashkent Soviet. He was one of the organizers of the Tashkent Rebellion (1917), a delegate to the 2nd All-Russian Congress of Soviets in Petrograd in October 1917, where he was elected a member of the All-Russian Central Executive Committee, as well as one of the organizers of the armed uprising against the power of representatives of the provisional government in Tashkent in November 1917.

From November 1917 to November 1918, Fyodor Kolesov was the chairman of the Council of People's Commissars (SNK) of the Turkestan Autonomous Soviet Socialist Republic, that is, the head of the Turkestan Republic and a member of the Turkestan Regional Party Committee. During this period, he personally commanded the troops that suppressed attempts to create autonomy in Ashgabat (the so-called Transcaspian Government) and Kokand (the Kokand Autonomy), as well as the Revolutionary troops that tried to overthrow the Emir of Bukhara by force in March 1918.

The actions of Fyodor Kolesov in the first year of the Civil War were sharply criticized by the prominent Red commander in the Turkestan Front, Yakov Melkumov in his memoirs.

He further participated in the Russian Civil War in 1918–20 as a political commissar. He was also a delegate to the 8th Congress of the Russian Communist Party in 1919.

In 1923 - 1928, F.I. Kolesov was chairman of the Supreme Economic Council of the Far East, a member of the Dalrevkom (Far Eastern Revolutionary Committee) and a member of the Gomel Provincial Executive Committee. In 1929 - 1933 he studied at the Moscow Architectural Institute and after graduating, worked as an architect.

He wrote his memoirs about the Bukharan Revolution, about his prominent role in the establishment of Soviet power in Uzbekistan and Turkestan. He died on 29 July 1940 in his apartment in Moscow. By decision of the Secretariat of the Central Committee of the All-Union Communist Party of Bolsheviks, he was buried at the Novodevichy Cemetery as an “Honored Revolutionary” (row 51, place 26). Taking into account Kolesov's important personal role in establishing Soviet power in Central Asia, an honorary rifle salvo was fired at the funeral.
