= Communist Party of Bukhara =

Ruling political party of the Bukharan SSR (1920–24)

Communist Party of Bukhara حزب کمونیست بخارا
- Founded: September 1918
- Dissolved: 27 October 1924
- Succeeded by: Communist Party of Uzbekistan; Communist Party of Turkmenistan
- Ideology: Communism; Marxism–Leninism
- Political position: Far-left
- National affiliation: Russian Communist Party (Bolsheviks) (1922–1924)

Party flag

The Communist Party of Bukhara (Persian: حزب کمونیست بخارا; Russian: Бухарская коммунистическая партия, romanized: Bukharskaya kommunisticheskaya partiya; Tajik: Ҳизби коммунистии Бухоро, romanized: Hizbi kommunistii Bukhoro; Uzbek: Buxoro Kommunistik Partiyasi) was a political party in the Bukharan People's Soviet Republic. The party was founded in 1918, by a section of the Jadid movement. It was led by N. Husainovym, A. Aliyev, N. Kurbanovym, A. Turaevym, amongst others.

The party sent a consultative delegate to the 2nd World Congress of the Communist International in the summer of 1920.

The 4th Party Congress, held 16–18 August 1920, appealed to the workers of Bukhara to prepare for armed revolution. Thereafter the Central Committee of the Communist Party of Turkestan decided to dispatch armed fighters to assist the revolution in Bukhara. The uprising began on August 23 in Sakar-Bazar. During one month, the territories of Bukhara were conquered by the revolutionary forces, with the help of the Red Army contingent led by Mikhail Frunze. On September 14 an All Bukhara Revolutionary Committee (i.e. a provisional government) was established. On October 8, the All Bukhara People's Congress launched the Bukharan People's Soviet Republic, with the Communist Party of Bukhara as a leading force.

On February 1, 1922, the Communist Party of Bukhara became an affiliate structure of the Russian Communist Party (Bolsheviks). When the Soviet Central Asian boundaries were redrawn in 1924, the Communist Party of Bukhara was dissolved and its branches divided between the Communist Party of Uzbekistan and the Communist Party of Turkmenistan.

== Party leaders ==
There were seven leaders of the party during its five-year existence:

Name	Took office	Left office
Chairmen of the Communist Party of Bukhara
Nadzhib Khusainov	27 June 1919	6 October 1920
Aslamkhodzha Umarkhodzhayev	6 October 1920	23 February 1921
Saidulla Tursunkhodzhayev	23 February 1921	3 July 1921
Executive Secretaries of the Communist Party of Bukhara
Abdurashid Mukamilov	5 July 1921	10 January 1922
Mukhtar Saidzhanov	1922	June 1923
Abdullo Rakhimbayev	4 July 1923	December 1923
Akhmetbek Mavlyanbekov	December 1923	15 November 1924
