= Bukhara State Architectural Art Museum-Preserve =

The Bukhara State Architectural Art Museum-Preserve is a museum preserve in Bukhara, Uzbekistan. It was founded in 1922 and contains archaeological and historical material relating to the region of Bukhara.

== Collections ==
The museum has a collection of 19,162 objects. These are mostly coins excavated in Bukhara and the surrounding area. Coins and currency circulating in Uzbekistan from the third century BC (the Greco-Bactrian_Kingdom) to the present day are represented.

Publications have been made on nineteenth and twentieth century popular women's jewellery that mixed silver coins with pearls, beads and silver decorations. These ornaments, known as tillo kosh or sinsila, were often worn by brides as symbols of prosperity and fertility.
