= Bukhara operation (1920) =

Military conflict during the Russian Civil War

Bukhara Operation
- Part of the Russian Civil War
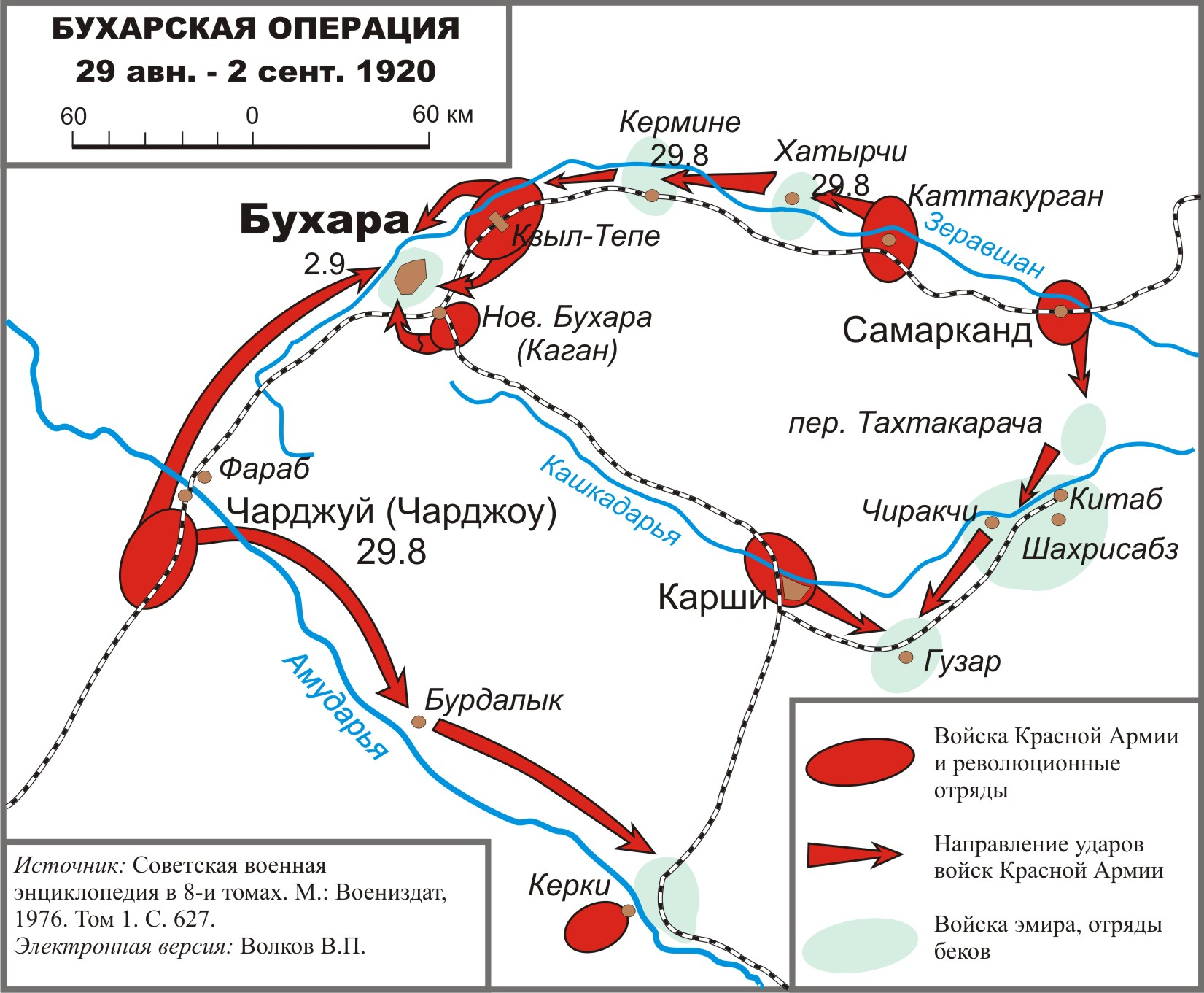
- Map of the Bukhara Operation (in Russian).
Date	28 August – 2 September 1920
Location	Bukhara, Emirate of Bukhara (now Uzbekistan)
Result	Communist victory; Fall of the Emirate
Territorial changes	Establishment of the Bukharan PSR

Belligerents
Russian SFSR; Young Bukharans	Emirate of Bukhara; Basmachi movement

Commanders and leaders
(Russian Soviet Federative Socialist Republic) Mikhail Frunze	(Emirate of Bukhara) Muhammad Alim Khan (surrendered)

Strength
6,000–7,000 bayonets 2,300–2,690 sabres 35 light guns 5 heavy guns 5 armored trains 11 aircraft	8,725 bayonets 7,580 sabres 23 light guns 27,000 irregulars

The Bukhara operation (1920), was a military conflict fought between the Russian Soviet Federative Socialist Republic and the Young Bukharans against the Emirate of Bukhara. The war lasted between 28 August and 2 September 1920, ending in the defeat of the Emirate of Bukhara, which was replaced by the RSFSR-controlled Bukharan People's Soviet Republic.

== Background ==
The Emirate of Bukhara was officially created in 1785, upon the assumption of the throne by the Manghit emir, Shah Murad. Over the course of the 18th century, the emirs slowly gained effective control of the Khanate of Bukhara from their position as ataliq. In 1868 the emirate was conquered by Imperial Russia, which had colonial aspirations in the region. Russia annexed much of the emirate's territory, including the important city of Samarkand.

The Russian Civil War erupted on 7 November 1917, pitting the Bolshevik-led Red Army against the White Army. During the first two years of the conflict, communist troops failed to make considerable progress in the Central Asian theaters, as the majority of Red Army forces were tied down on other fronts. In spring 1918, a group of British intelligence agents visited Tashkent in an effort to identify what was happening in the region, due to poor British intelligence. The mission was headed by British officer Frederick Marshman Bailey, who subsequently went on to evade Bolshevik capture for several months until he escaped.

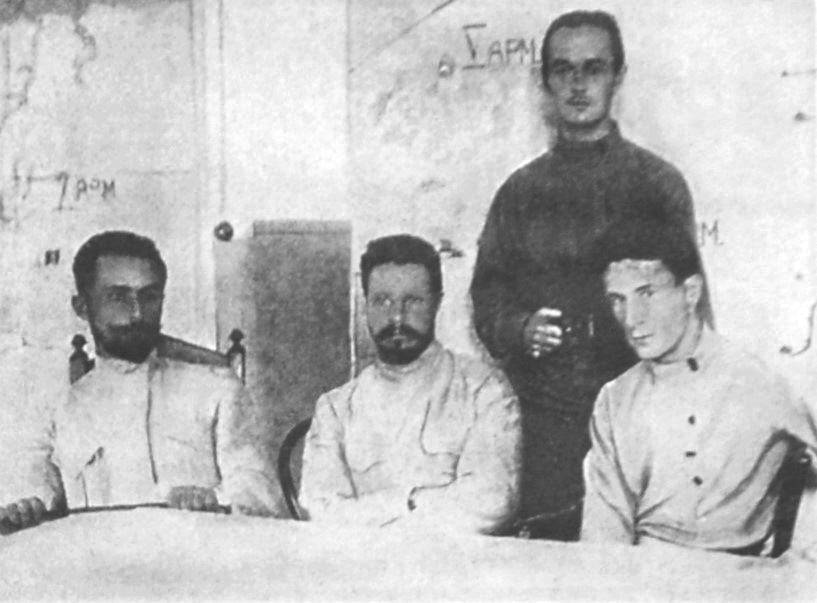
Grigory Sokolnikov, Mikhail Frunze and Valerian Kuybyshev. Red Army troops offensive against the city of Bukhara. Aug 1920

The defeat of the White Army troops led by Alexander Kolchak during the second half of 1919 radically changed the situation on the Turkestani theater of the war. The Red Turkestan Front was formed on 14 August 1919, as the communists began relocating their forces by means of the Central Asian railroad network that had remained intact since the beginning of the war. The emir of Bukhara became aware of the communist maneuvers, enacting mobilization, which brought Bukhara's army to a total of 35,000 soldiers, 15 machine guns and 55 small cannons. A surge in the activities of the leftist Young Bukharans movement in August 1920 prompted Red Army commander Mikhail Frunze to act in their support.

== The Battle ==
Οn the night 28 August 1920, Young Bukharans launched a revolt in Charjou, subjugating the city. At the same time the Red Army launched an offensive on Qorakoʻl, approaching it from the south-west. On 30 August, communist troops had reached Bukhara and began bombarding the Karshin gates, in preparation of an upcoming assault. Soviet forces then attacked the bridges over the Burdalik, Nardalik and Amu Darya rivers, securing them on 31 August.

That day, Red Army reinforcements arrived with new guns. Heavy artillery was positioned closer to the walls: fortress 152-mm cannons on platforms and 122-mm batteries. A massive bombardment of the city was unleashed. The Red Army had no shortage of shells, which were supplied by rail. A total of 12,000 shells were fired upon the city. A breach appeared in the city wall, which was enlarged by a detachment of sappers in armored cars.

On 2 September, communist forces penetrated the gates and overtook Bukhara. The city was on fire. Emir Muhammad Alim Khan had however already fled to the eastern part of the state with a group of 1,000 soldiers.

The remaining Bukhara troops entrench themselves in the Ark fortress. Frunze ordered the Ark to be bombed by heavy artillery and aircraft, which left the fortress in ruins. The fortress surrendered the same day.

== Aftermath ==
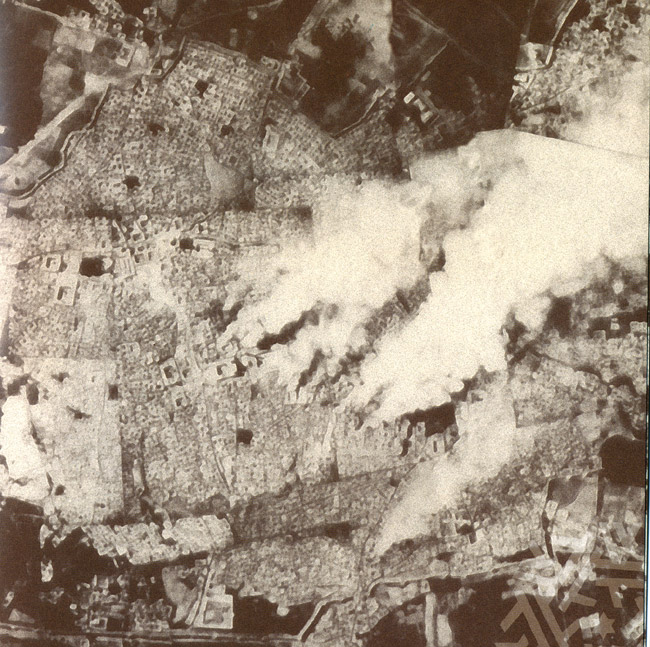
Fires in Bukhara under siege by Red Army troops, 1 September 1920

The old center of Bukhara had been greatly damaged and hundreds of civilians had been killed. Alim Khan's defeat enabled the revolutionaries to establish the RSFSR-controlled Bukharan PSR, which became part of the new Uzbek Soviet Socialist Republic from 1924.

Muhammad Alim Khan was forced to emigrate to Dushanbe and eventually supported Enver Pasha and his campaign against bolshevik power.

Exactly 71 years later after this event, Uzbekistan would then declare independence from the Soviet Union on 1 September 1991, after the failed coup in Moscow.

== See also ==
- Soviet Central Asia
