= Vladimir Nalivkin =

Russian military officer

- Владимир Наливкин
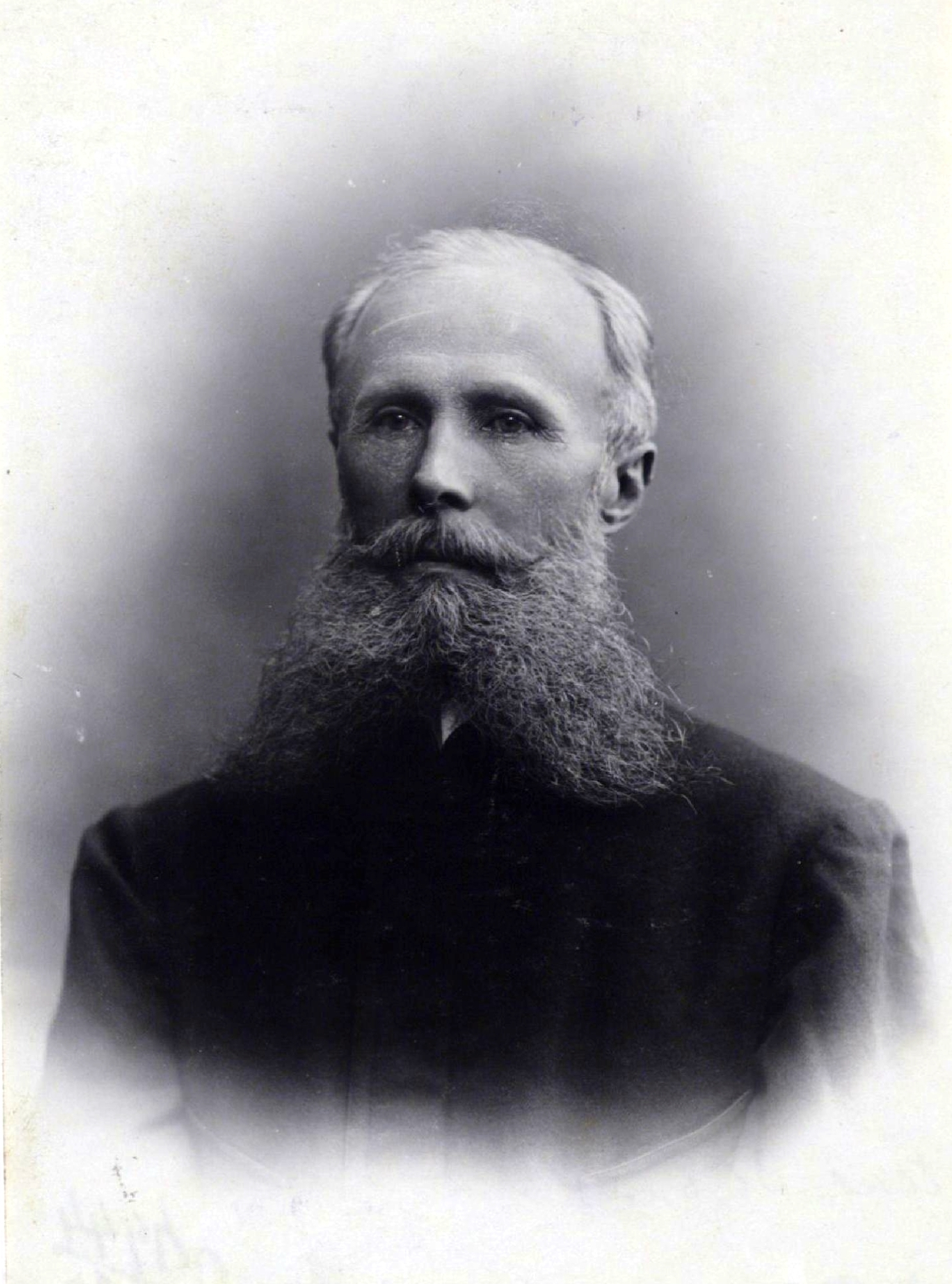

Personal details
- Born: Vladimir Petrovich Nalivkin; 25 February 1852 Kaluga, Russian Empire
- Died: 20 January 1918 (aged 65) Tashkent, Turkestan Autonomy,

Military service
- Allegiance: Russian Empire
- Branch/service: Imperial Russian Army

Vladimir Petrovich Nalivkin (Russian: Влади́мир Петро́вич Нали́вкин, 25 February 1852 – 20 January 1918) was a Russian military officer during the Russian Empire's campaigns in Central Asia, entering civil government for the new territory of Russian Turkestan, becoming head of the governing committee and representing the capital Tashkent in Imperial State Duma. Nalivkin went into hiding after the territory fell to communists during the Russian Revolution, and committed suicide in 1918.

== Background ==
Vladimir Petrovich Nalivkin was born on 25 February 1852, in Kaluga, Russian Empire, to a noble family. He graduated from the Pavel Military School in Saint Petersburg, opting to serve in the Orenburg Cossack Regiment.

== Central Asia ==
In 1873 Nalivkin served in the Russian Imperial Army during the annexation of Turkestan, participating in the conquest of the Khanate of Khiva, and eventually became commander of the Turkestan Military District. In protest against the harsh treatment of the civilian population by General Mikhail Skobelev, Nalivkin resigned from the military and entered civil government, where he was placed as the assistant head of the Fergana Valley region. He worked as an ethnologist and explorer in Fergana, and authored the first Russian-Uzbek dictionary. Additionally, during this time Nalivkin coauthored an ethnography entitled Muslim Women of the Fergana Valley: A 19th Century Ethnography from Central Asia with his wife, Maria Nalivkina. Between 1878 and 1884, Maria Nalivkina learned the local language and gained an intimate insight into the lives of ordinary Sart women. Nalivkina’s contribution to the ethnography was the first to explore the lives of women in the area. Nalivkin was later appointed as the head of the Turkestan Committee of the Provisional Government set up shortly after the annexation of the territory into the Russian Empire was complete, and represented the capital Tashkent in the Imperial State Duma.

== Russian Revolution ==
In March 1917 the Russian Revolution began, starting with the February Revolution which led to the collapse of the Russian Imperial Government and formation of the Provisional Government. Despite being a member of the Imperial Duma, Nalivkin was initially sympathetic to the revolution and the Provisional Government, believing it would bring improvements to quality of life among the people of the empire. However, when the revolution reached Tashkent ideological differences soon brought Nalivkin into conflict with the revolutionaries.

== Death ==
On 1 November 1917 a coalition of the Left Social Revolutionaries and Bolsheviks seized power in Tashkent, overthrowing the Nalivkin-led committee from local government control, and transferring it to a communist-led committee which appointed new chiefs. Nalivkin was sent into hiding, and on 20 January 1918 committed suicide.
