= Young Bukharans =

Bukharan jadidist secret society

The Young Bukharans (Persian: جوان‌بخارائیان; Uzbek: Yosh buxoroliklar) or Mladobukharans were a secret society founded in Bukhara in 1909, which was part of the jadidist movement seeking to reform and modernize Central Asia along Western-scientific lines.

In March 1918 they tried to seize power in Bukhara, with help from the Tashkent Soviet, and the Young Bukharans had to flee from the Emir, Mohammed Alim Khan to Tashkent. They returned in May 1920, and this time were successful: the Red Army took Bukhara and the Young Bukharans formed the first government of the Bukharan People's Soviet Republic. Most of the members were purged during 1936–1938.

Young Khivans and Young Bukharans inspired the Kashgar 1933 Association of Independence.

== Prominent members ==
- Abdurrauf Fitrat
- Abdul Kadir Mukhitdinov
- Akmal Ikramov
- Faizullah Khojaev
- Osman Kocaoğlu
- Mahmudkhodja Behbudiy
- Muhiddin Mansurov
- Munawwar Qari

== See also ==
- Young Kashgar Party
