= Fayzulla Xoʻjayev =

Bukharan politician (1896–1938)

- Файзулла Хўжаев (Uzbek); Файзулла Ходжаев (Russian)
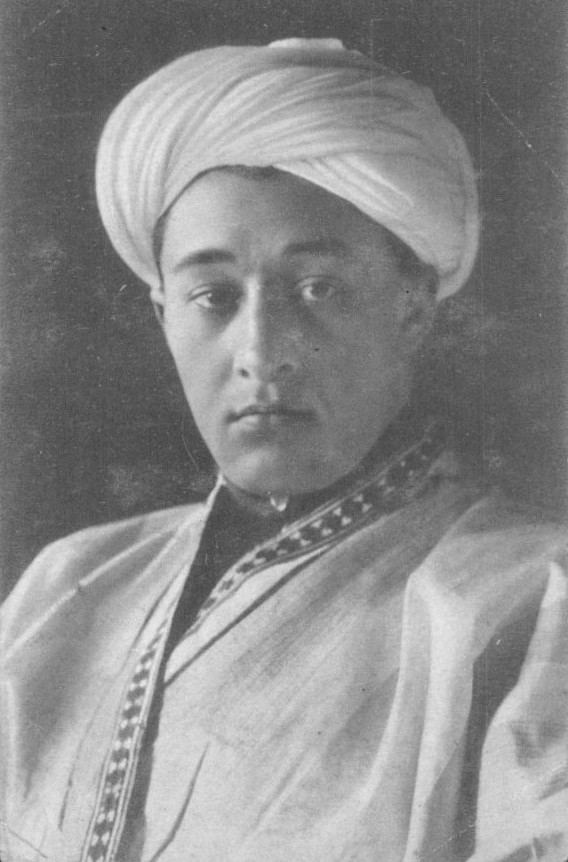

Chairman of the Central Executive Committee of the USSR from Uzbek SSR
- In office 21 May 1925 – 17 June 1937
- Preceded by: Position established
- Succeeded by: Position abolished

Chairman of the Council of People's Commissars of Uzbek SSR
- In office 27 October 1924 – 17 June 1937
- Preceded by: Position established
- Succeeded by: Abdulla Karimov

Chairman of the Council of People's Nazirs of the Bukharan PSR
- In office 2 September 1920 – 27 October 1924
- Preceded by: Position established
- Succeeded by: Abdurauf Fitrat

Personal details
- Born: 1 June 1896 Bukhara, Emirate of Bukhara, Russian Empire
- Died: 15 March 1938 (aged 41) Kommunarka shooting ground, Moscow, Russian SFSR, Soviet Union
- Party: Communist Party of the Soviet Union (1920–1937)
- Awards: Order of Lenin; Order of the Red Banner (2)

Fayzulla Ubaydulloyevich Xo‘jayev (Uzbek pronunciation: [fæjzuˈlːæ ubæjduˈlːɒjevitʃ xoˈdʒajev]; Uzbek Cyrillic: Файзулла Убайдуллоевич Хўжаев; Russian: Файзулла Убайдуллаевич Ходжаев, romanized: Faizulla Ubaydullayevich Khodzhayev) was a Bukharan politician who served as the first head of the Bukharan People's Soviet Republic, which would later form part of the Uzbek Soviet Socialist Republic.

== Early years ==
Xoʻjayev was born into a family of wealthy traders in the city of Bukhara (part of the Emirate of Bukhara) in 1896. He was sent to Moscow by his father in 1907. There he realized the tremendous gap between contemporary European society and technology, and the ancient, tradition-bound ways of his homeland. His father died in 1912.

He joined the pan-Turkist Jadid movement of like-minded reformers in 1916, and, with his father's fortune, established the Young Bukharan Party. In March 1918, after the Bolsheviks had successfully established Soviet rule in Kokand, Xoʻjayev led an attempt to form a Young Bukharan government, with the Emir of Bukhara as a figurehead. For a few days, it appeared that they had succeeded, and had the Emir as a virtual prisoner, but in his account, written later, Xoʻjayev admitted that he and his fellow revolutionaries had been "gullible" and had underestimated the influence of the clergy and the strength of forces loyal to the old regime. In the resulting reaction, thousands of supporters of the Young Bukharans were killed. Xoʻjayev escaped to Tashkent and was sentenced to death in his absence. He was able to return only after the Emir of Bukhara fled in September 1920 after the Red Army had overthrown his administration on 2 September 1920, bombed the city of Bukhara and occupied it.

== The government years ==
After joining the Russian Communist Party about July–August 1920, at the age of 24, Fayzulla Xoʻjayev was appointed Chairman of the Council of People's Nazirs (i.e. head of government) of the Bukharan People's Soviet Republic in September 1920. During his term, on July 7 1922, a Basmachi assassination attempt on his life failed. The Bukharan Republic was temporarily recognised as an independent state by the Soviet government in Moscow, who sent an ambassador and 'advisers' to support Xoʻjayev's government. One of the Russian diplomats, Alexander Barmine, recalled:

The new government carried on its work in exactly the same way that governments of Bukhara had for hundreds of years. I would see a Nazir, or minister, squatting on a carpet and dictating decrees to a scribe, who would write them in old Persian characters on a board balanced on his knees. Fayzulla Xoʻjayev, called the "Lenin of the Uzbeks", was small, wiry, and full of consuming energy, in spite of the malaria which often gave his face a greenish tinge, He enjoyed life, and could laugh gaily beneath a crushing load of work. He knew his people, was a great orator, and was much loved.

With the reorganization of Soviet Central Asia into the new Uzbek Soviet Socialist Republic and after the purge of suspected Uzbek nationalists in 1923–1924, on 5 December 1924, Xoʻjayev became Chair of the Revolutionary Committee of the Uzbek SSR – at which time he was recognized as the head of government – and then on 17 February 1925, he became Chair of the Council of People's Commissars of the Uzbek Soviet Socialist Republic. Then on 21 May 1925, he became one of the chairmen of the Central Executive Committee once the Uzbek SSR was officially accepted into the Soviet Union.

However, Xoʻjayev opposed Joseph Stalin's heavy-handed control, particularly in the matter of cotton monoculture. Although he retained his post as head of government, from 1929 his influence and access to Moscow was eclipsed by Akmal Ikramov, the First Secretary of the Uzbek communist party. Unlike Ikramov, Xoʻjayev was never elected to the Central Committee of the Communist Party of the Soviet Union.

== Final years ==
In June 1937, Xoʻjayev, though still nominally head of the Uzbek government, was conspicuously absent when the Uzbek Communist Party held its Seventh Congress. He was not even elected a delegate. On 27 June, ten days after the congress ended, he was removed from office. He was arrested by 9 July 1937. In September, a member of the Politburo, Andrey Andreyev arrived in Tashkent to bring the Great Purge to Uzbekistan, and on 8 September and seven others were denounced as "enemies of the people".

Andrew D. W. Forbes writes that Xoʻjayev was also "accused of having buried his dead brother according to Islamic rites".

In March 1938, Xoʻjayev and Ikramov were both arraigned at the Trial of the Twenty-One in Moscow. Though accused of acting together, their hostility was apparent in the courtroom, with each accusing the other of lying. Xoʻjayev "confessed" that in the early 1920s he had been a member of a secret pan-Turkic society, Milli Ittikhad (National Unification) that wanted to preserve the Bukharan Republic as an independent buffer state, between Russia and the British Empire, that he had opposed the breakdown of Turkestan into four separate Soviet republics, of which Uzbekistan was one, and opposed the decision made in Moscow as part of the first five-year plan to create a cotton monoculture in Uzbekistan's Ferghana Valley, and to being linked to the Right Opposition. He was sentenced to death, and executed on 13 March 1938. He was buried at Kommunarka Cemetery in Moskva.

== Legacy ==
Officially rehabilitated in 1966, he remains a controversial figure in modern Uzbekistan.

There are few monuments to him in modern Uzbekistan, and although his father's house in Bukhara is preserved as a monument (Fayzulla Xoʻjayev house museum), it is styled as "House of a Wealthy Local Merchant", with very little emphasis on Xoʻjayev himself.

== Awards ==
- Order of the Red Banner (1920 and 1922)
- Order of Red Star of the Bukhara People's Soviet Republic
- Order of Lenin

| Preceded by none | Head of Government of Uzbekistan; 1924–1925 | Succeeded by Vladimir Ivanov |
