= Bukharan People's Soviet Republic =

1920–1924 Soviet republic in Central Asia

Bukharan People's Soviet Republic (1920–1924) بخارا خلق شورالر جمهوریتی بۇخارا خەلق شورالەر جۇمھۇرییەتى Buxoro Xalq Shoʻro Jumhuriyati (Uzbek) Бухарская Народная Советская Республика (Russian) جمهوری خلقی شوروی بخارا Ҷумҳурии Халқии Шӯравии Бухоро (Tajik) Bukharan Socialist Soviet Republic (1924) بۇخارا ئیجتیماعیی شورالەر جۇمھۇرییەتى Buxoro Sotsialistik Shoʻro Jumhuriyati (Uzbek) Бухарская Социалистическая Советская Республика (Russian) جمهوری اجتماعی شوروی بخارا Ҷумҳурии Сотсиалистии Шӯравии Бухоро (Tajik)
- 1920–1924
- Flag State Emblem
- Motto: Butun dunyo proletarlari, birlashingiz! "Proletarians of the whole world, unite!"
- The Bukharan People's Soviet Republic in 1922
- Capital: Bukhara
- Common languages: Uzbek · Tajik · Russian
- Demonym: Bukharan
- Government: Soviet republic
- Historical era: Interwar period
  - Monarchy overthrown: 2 September 1920
  - Established: 8 October 1920
  - Part of USSR: 27 October 1924

Area
  - Total: 182,193 km^{2} (70,345 sq mi)

Population
  - Estimate: 2,200,000
Preceded by
Emirate of Bukhara
Succeeded by
Turkmen SSR
Uzbek SSR
Tajik ASSR
- Today part of: Uzbekistan; Tajikistan; Turkmenistan

The Bukharan People's Soviet Republic (Note: Uzbek: pre-1921 orthography: بخارا خلق شورالر جمھوریتی 1921–1926 orthography:بۇخارا خەلق شورالەر جۇمھۇرىيەتى, romanized: Buxoro xalq sho'ro jumhuriyati; Tajik: جمهوری خلق شوروی بخارا / Ҷумҳурии Халқии Шӯравии Бухоро, romanized: Jumhurii Xalqii Shūravii Buxoro; Russian: Бухарская Народная Советская Республика, romanized: Bukharskaya Narodnaya Sovetskaya Respublika) was a Soviet state that governed the former Emirate of Bukhara during the years immediately following the Russian Revolution. In 1924, its name was changed to the Bukharan Socialist Soviet Republic (Bukharan SSR). (Note: 1921–1926 orthography:Uzbek: بۇخارا ئیجتیماعیی شورالەر جۇمھۇرىيەتى, romanized: Buxoro ijtimoiy sho'ro jumhuriyati; Tajik: جمهوری اجتماعی شوروی بخارا / Ҷумҳурии Иҷтимоӣи Шӯравии Бухоро, romanized: Jumhurii Içtimoīi Shūravii Buxoro; Russian: Бухарская Социалистическая Советская Республика) After the redrawing of regional borders, its territory was assigned mostly to the Uzbek SSR and some to the Turkmen SSR.

== History ==
Soviet Central Asia in 1922

In 1868, the Russian Empire forced the Emirate of Bukhara to accept protectorate status. Over the next 40 years, the Russians slowly eroded Bukhara's territory, although they never actually annexed the city of Bukhara itself. Despite the emirate’s efforts to limit outside influences, Bukharan youth gravitated to Pan-Turkism, inspired by the Young Turks in the Ottoman Empire, ideas taken from the Islamic Jadid reform movement, and the new Bolshevik-inspired communism. These various ideologies coalesced in the Young Bukharans (Russian: младобухарцы, mladobukhartsy), led by Fayzulla Xoʻjayev.

=== Young Bukharans ===
The Young Bukharans faced obstacles as the emirate was dominated by conservative Sunni Islamic clergy. The ensuing conflict pitted the secular Young Bukharans and their Bolshevik supporters against the conservative pro-emir rebels, the Basmachi, in a conflict that lasted more than a decade.

In March 1918, the Young Bukharan activists informed the Bolsheviks that the Bukharan people were ready for the revolution and awaiting liberation from the emir. The Red Army marched to the gates of Bukhara and demanded that the emir surrender the city to the Young Bukharans. A Russian source reports that the emir responded by killing the Bolshevik delegation and incited the population to a jihad against the Bolshevik "infidels". Thousands of Russians were killed in these riots in Bukhara and the surrounding areas .The main railway and communication links from Bukhara to Chardjui and Samarkand were also destroyed.

By August 1920 the Turkestan Bolsheviks advocated the liquidation of the Bukhara Emirate as a centre for counter-revolutionary forces. On 3 August 1920 the Bolsheviks and the Young Bukharans agreed to cooperate on the understanding that the Young Bukharans would join the Communist Party. On 16 August 1920 the 4th Congress of Bukharan Communist Party held in Bolshevik-controlled Chardjui decided to overthrow the emir. On 25 August 1920 the Politburo of the Russian Communist Party of Bolsheviks confirmed orders for the Revolutionary Military Council of Turkestan concerning the "Bukhara question".

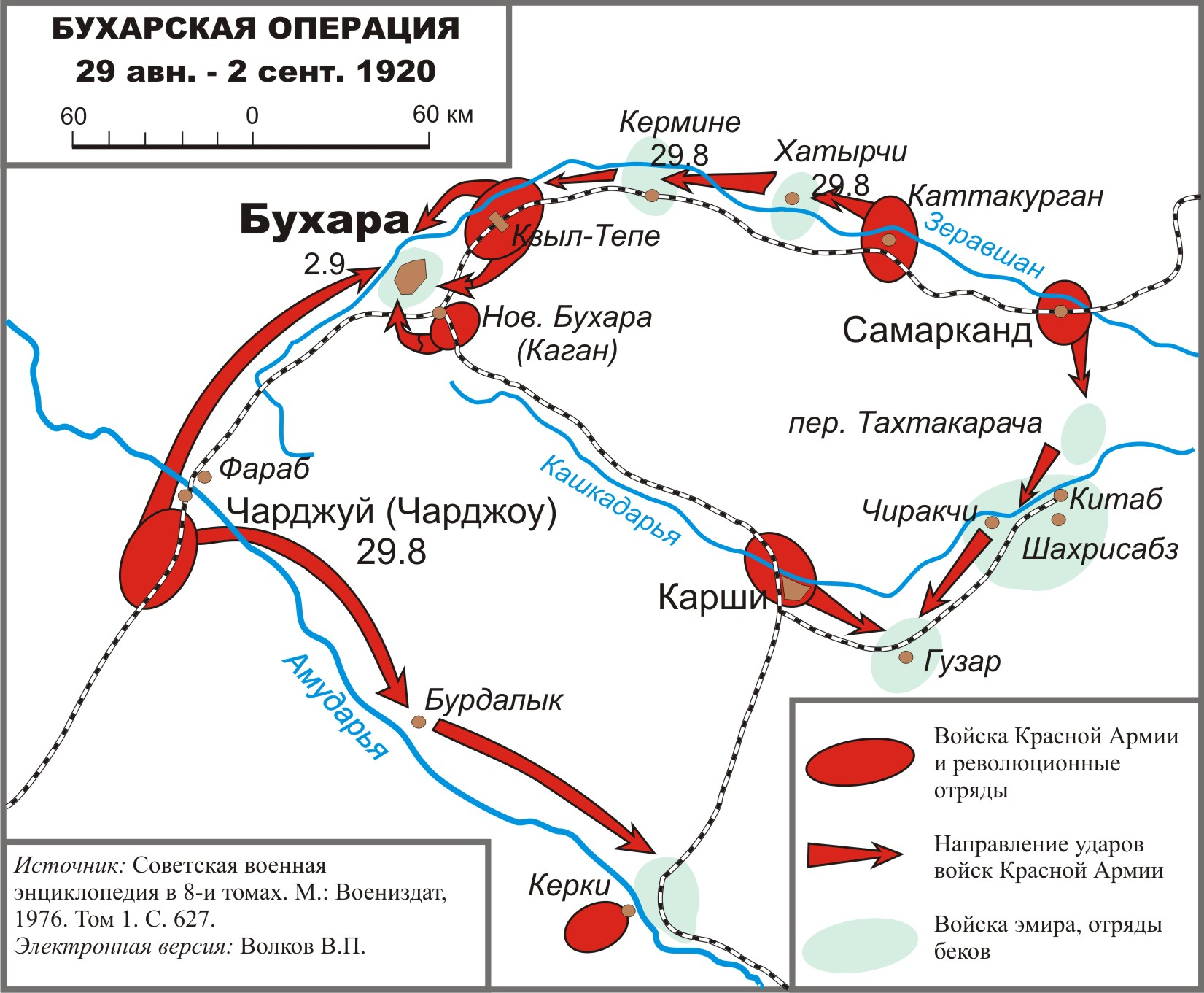
The Bukhara military operation, 1920

On 28 August 1920, Red Army troops under the command of Bolshevik general Mikhail Frunze attacked the city of Bukhara. On 31 August 1920, the Emir Alim Khan fled to Dushanbe in Eastern Bukhara. On 2 September 1920, after four days of fighting, the emir's citadel was destroyed. On 14 September 1920, the All-Bukharan Revolutionary Committee was set up, headed by A. Mukhitdinov. The government – the Council of People's Nazirs (see nāẓir) – was presided over by Faizullah Khojaev.

=== Bukharan People's Soviet Republic ===
The Bukharan People's Soviet Republic was proclaimed on 8 October 1920 under Fayzulla Xoʻjayev. In Soviet terminology, the republic was a "revolutionary-democratic dictatorship of the proletariat and the peasantry", a transition stage to a Soviet Socialist Republic. A new constitution was adopted in September 1921, which, contrary to the Russian Constitution of 1918, allowed private ownership of land and productive assets and granted voting rights to non-proletarians (although relatives of the deposed emir, former emirate officials, and large landowners could not vote).

Although the constitution adopted on September 25, 1921, based the sovereignty of the republic on soviets, it achieved a significant compromise with traditional Islamic principles. According to Article 26 of the constitution, no law of the republic could contradict the fundamental principles of Islam. Moreover, unlike the Soviet model, the constitution guaranteed the right to private property and the authority of citizens to dispose of their movable and immovable possessions. In local administration, the long-established aksakal system, in which villagers elected their own representatives, was preserved.

The overthrow of the emir was the impetus for the Basmachi Revolt, a conservative anti-communist rebellion. In 1922, most of the territory of the republic (East Bukhara, roughly from Hisor to West Pamir) was controlled by Basmachi, and it took the Red Army until 1934 to fully suppress the revolt. At the end of 1921, Enver Pasha assumed the leadership of the movement and unified the struggle against the Soviets with the aim of establishing a “Muslim state” across Turkestan. However, he was killed in Baljuan in 1922.

During the first few years of the Russian Revolution, Lenin relied on a policy of encouraging local revolutions under the aegis of the local bourgeoisie, and in the early years of Bolshevik rule the Communists sought the assistance of the Jadid reformists in pushing through radical social and educational reforms. Just two weeks after the proclamation of the People's Republic, Communist Party membership in Bukhara soared to 14,000 as many local inhabitants were eager to prove their loyalty to the new regime. As the Soviet Union stabilized, it could afford to purge itself of so-called opportunists and potential nationalists. A series of expulsions stripped membership down by 1922.

Immediately after the revolution, the Revolutionary Committee (Revkom) promised the nationalization of land, water, and the means of production, as well as their redistribution to landless peasants. However, most of these promises could not be fully implemented due to internal resistance and a lack of resources.

The most radical change in the cultural sphere was the recognition of Uzbek as the state language. This policy aimed to shift the state from Persian, the language of the elites, to the language of the broader population. In the field of education, Minister of Education Abdurrauf Fitrat sought to modernize the system by sending many students to European universities, particularly in Germany, and by introducing secular sciences into the curricula of madrasas.

The above was reflected in the Bukharan People's Soviet Republic's flag, as designed upon its foundation, combining the Communist Hammer and Sickle with the traditional Crescent, which had appeared in the flag of the Emirate of Bukhara as well as in those of the Ottoman Empire and various other Islamic states. Conversely, the flags of the Soviet Republics among which the Bukharan territory was divided in 1924 featured the Hammer and Sickle alone, omitting the Crescent.

From 1923 onward, Moscow increased its pressure on local governance, and figures such as Stalin and Pozdnyshev accused the Bukharan government of “bourgeois nationalism” and of neglecting class interests. As a result of these pressures, extensive purges were carried out within both the government and the Communist Party. At the Fifth Congress, convened on September 19, 1924, the state changed its name to the “Socialist Republic.” Shortly thereafter, within the framework of the National Delimitation of Central Asia, a decision was made to dissolve the republic and to divide its territory between the newly established Uzbek SSR and Tajik ASSR. With this decision, the centuries-old Bukharan state disappeared from the political map.

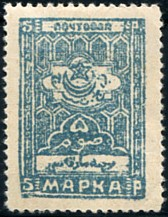
Postage stamp from August 1924

=== Bukharan Socialist Soviet Republic ===
Flag of the Bukharan SSR

From 19 September 1924 to 27 October 1924, the Republic was known as the Bukharan Socialist Soviet Republic (Bukharan SSR). When new national boundaries were drawn up in 1924, the Bukharan SSR voted itself out of existence and became part of the new Uzbek SSR. Today the territory of the defunct Bukhara SSR lies mostly in Uzbekistan with parts in Tajikistan and Turkmenistan.

Khojaev, despite his Jadid background, became the first President of the Uzbek SSR. He was later purged and executed in the 1930s together with much of the intelligentsia of Central Asia.

== Political leaders ==
Denotes Acting leader

Name	Took office	Left office	Party	Notes
Chairmen of the Central Revolutionary Committee
Mirzo Abduqodir Mansurovich Mukhitdinov	2 September 1920	22 September 1921	Communist Party of Bukhara	Styled Chairman of the Provisional Revolutionary Committee from 2 September to 6 October 1920
Polat Usmon Khodzhayev	25 September 1921	8 December 1921	Communist Party of Bukhara	
Chairmen of the Presidium of the Central Executive Committee
Polat Usmon Khodzhayev	23 September 1921	12 April 1922	Communist Party of Bukhara	
Muin Jon Aminov	12 April 1922	18 August 1922	Communist Party of Bukhara	
Porsa Khodzhayev	18 August 1922	27 October 1924	Communist Party of Bukhara	
Chairmen of the Council of People's Nazirs (Ministers)
Fayzulla Xoʻjayev	8 October 1920	19 April 1923	Communist Party of Bukhara	
Mirzo Abduqodir Mansurovich Mukhitdinov	15 June 1923	27 October 1924	Communist Party of Bukhara	

== Geography of partition ==
The Bukharan People's Soviet Republic (Bukharan PSR) had an area of 182,193 km^{2} (70,345 sq mi) and a population of more than 2.2 million people, mainly Uzbeks, Tajiks, and Turkmens. During its entire existence from 1920 to 1924, the Bukharan PSR was a large enclave within the Turkestan Autonomous Soviet Socialist Republic (Turkestan ASSR) created in April 1918 on the territory of Russian Turkestan. Bukharan PSR, together with the Khorezm PSR, stretched from north-west to south-east in a belt that cut Turkestan ASSR into two separate parts: the small part in the south-west, corresponding to today's Turkmenistan (except a narrow strip along the southern bank of Amudarya, which was included in the Bukharan PSR), and the much larger part in the north-east, corresponding to sections of today's Uzbekistan, Tajikistan, Kyrgyzstan, and Kazakhstan. The southern border of the Bukharan PSR stretched from north-west to south-east along the southern bank of Amudarya to Termez and then along the Panj into West Pamir, reaching Langar at its south-eastern extreme point. It bordered Samarkand Oblast to the north-east and the southern part of Fergana Oblast to the east in West Pamir. The northern border of the People's Republic reached close to Khiva in the west and touched on what is today Karakalpakstan and Navoiy Region in Uzbekistan.

The People's Republic, like the Emirate of Bukhara that it succeeded, was divided into West Bukhara, including the cities of Bukhara and Karshi, and East Bukhara, roughly from Hisor to West Pamir. In the process of national delimitation of Central Asia in 1924, West Bukhara was included in the newly created Uzbek SSR (except for the south bank of Amudarya with the city of Chardjui, which went to Turkmen SSR), whereas East Bukhara, from Hisor to West Pamir, was ceded to Tajik Autonomous Soviet Socialist Republic (Tajik ASSR) and thus formed part of the Tajik SSR that was created later in 1929.

== See also ==
- Transoxiana
- Emirate of Bukhara
- Khorezm People's Soviet Republic
