= Harawi (surname) =

Harawi (from Arabic هَرَوِيّ Harawī; Classical Persian: هَرَوِی Harawī) or Heravi (Iranian Persian pronunciation) is an Arabic locational surname, or nisba, denoting origin from Herat (Arabic: هَرَاة Harāh; Classical Persian: هَرَات Harāt), a city in modern-day Afghanistan.

Notable people with the surname include:

== Harawi ==
- Abu'l-Fadl Harawi, 10th-century Persian astronomer
- Abu Dharr al-Harawi (946–1042), 10th-century Islamic scholar
- Ali ibn Abi Bakr al-Harawi (died 1215), 12th and 13th century Persian traveller and poet
- Asafi Harawi (1449–1517), 15th and 16th century Persian poet
- Mir Zahid Harawi (died 1689), 17th-century Islamic scholar
- Muhammad ibn Yusuf al-Harawi (fl. 1492–1518 and died 1542), late 15th-century Persian physician from Herat
- Muwaffaq ibn Ali al-Harawi, 10th-century Persian physician
- Nimat Allah al-Harawi (fl. 1613–c. 1630), chronicler and historian at the court of the Mughal Emperor Jahangir
- Nizam al-Din Alisher Harawi (1441–1501), Turkic poet and politician
- Qasim Madih Harawi, author of the Jahangirnama (Qasim Madih Harawi)

== Heravi ==
- Abd al-Rafe Heravi, 12th-century Persian poet
- Bibi Heravi (997–1084), Persian poet
- Husseini Heravi (1245–1318), Persian author and poet
- Majid Momhed-Heravi (born 1952), Iranian chemist
- Mehri Heravi, 15th-century Persian poet
- Mir Ali Heravi, 16th-century Persian calligrapher and calligraphy teacher
- Mostafa Heravi (born 1974), Iranian filmmaker, photographer and visual artist
