= Harawi =

Harawi may refer to:

- Harawi (surname), an Arabic locational surname meaning “of Herat”, including a list of people with the surname
- Harawî, a nomos in ancient Egypt
- Harawi (genre), a traditional genre of music and poetry of indigenous peoples of the Andes
- Harawi (Messiaen), a song cycle by Olivier Messiaen for soprano and piano
