= Heravi =

Heravi may refer to:

- Harawi (surname), an Arabic locational surname meaning “of Herat”, including a list of people with the surname
- Heravi (Tabriz County), a village in East Azerbaijan, Iran
- Heravi Metro Station, a metro station in Tehran, Iran
- Hirvi, a village in Kermanshah, Iran
