= Chagatai language =

Extinct Karluk Turkic language

Chagatai
- Turki
- چغتای Čaġatāy; Türkī / Türkčä
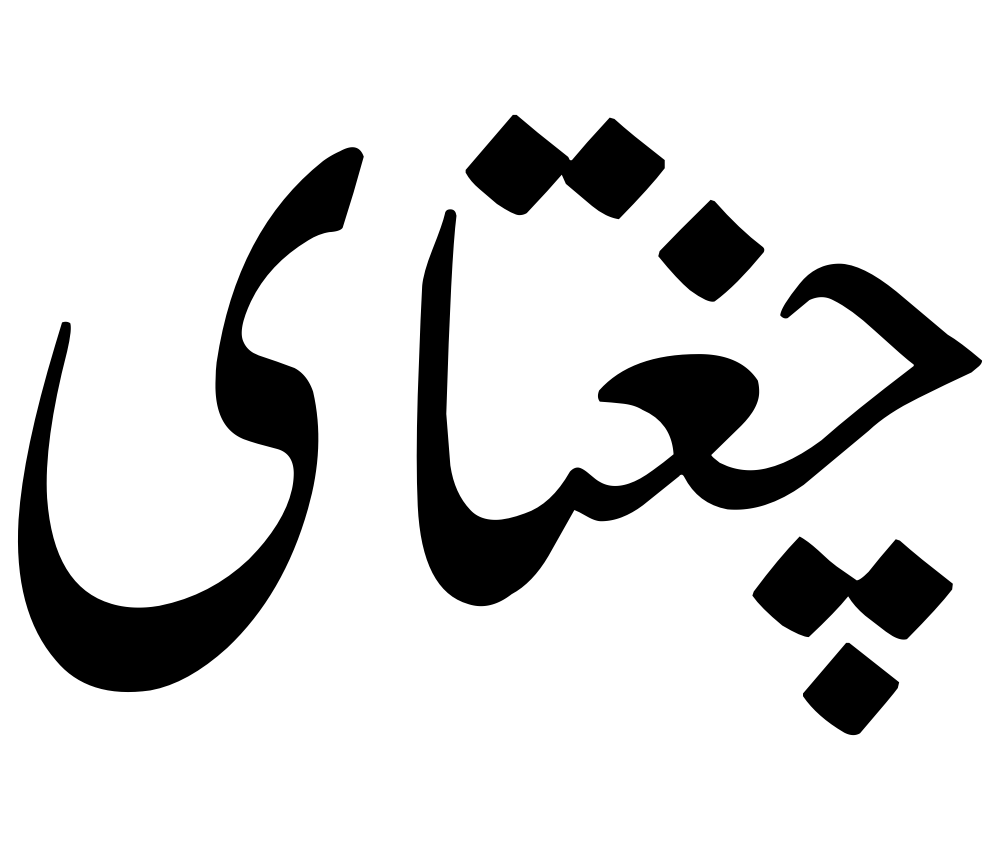
- Chagatai (چغتای) written in Nastaliq script
- Region: Central Asia
- Extinct: c. 1921; Developed into Uyghur and Uzbek
- Language family: Turkic: Common Turkic; Karluk; Chagatai
- Early forms: Karakhanid: Khorezmian Turkic
- Writing system: Perso-Arabic script (Nastaliq)

Official status
- Official language in: Chagatai Khanate; Moghul Khanate; Golden Horde; Crimean Khanate; Kazakh Khanate; Kazan Khanate; Siberian Khanate; Yarkand Khanate; Turpan Khanate; Timurid Empire; Mughal Empire; Khivan Khanate; Bukhara Khanate; Kokand Khanate; Ottoman Empire

Language codes
- ISO 639-2: chg
- ISO 639-3: chg
- Glottolog: chag1247

Chagatai (Note: Also spelled Chagatay, Chaghatai, Jaghatai or Chaghatay) (چغتای, Čaġatāy), also known as Turki, (Note: The word "Chagatai" was almost never used by the authors of the 15th and 16th centuries, who preferred the general expressions türk tili, türk alfāzï, türkī tili, türkī lafẓï, türkčä til or simply türkī, türkčä, meaning "Turkic".) Eastern Turkic, or Chagatai Turkic (Čaġatāy türkīsi), was a Turkic language that was once widely spoken across Central Asia. It remained the shared literary language in the region until the early 20th century when it went extinct. It was used across a wide geographic area including western or Russian Turkestan (i.e. parts of modern-day Uzbekistan, Turkmenistan, Kazakhstan, Kyrgyzstan), Eastern Turkestan, Crimea, the Volga-Ural region (such as Tatarstan and Bashkortostan), etc.

Chagatai is the direct ancestor of the Uzbek and Uyghur languages. Kazakh and Turkmen, which are not within the Karluk branch but are in the Kipchak and Oghuz branches of the Turkic languages respectively, had been nonetheless heavily influenced by Chagatai for centuries.

Ali-Shir Nava'i was the greatest representative of Chagatai literature.

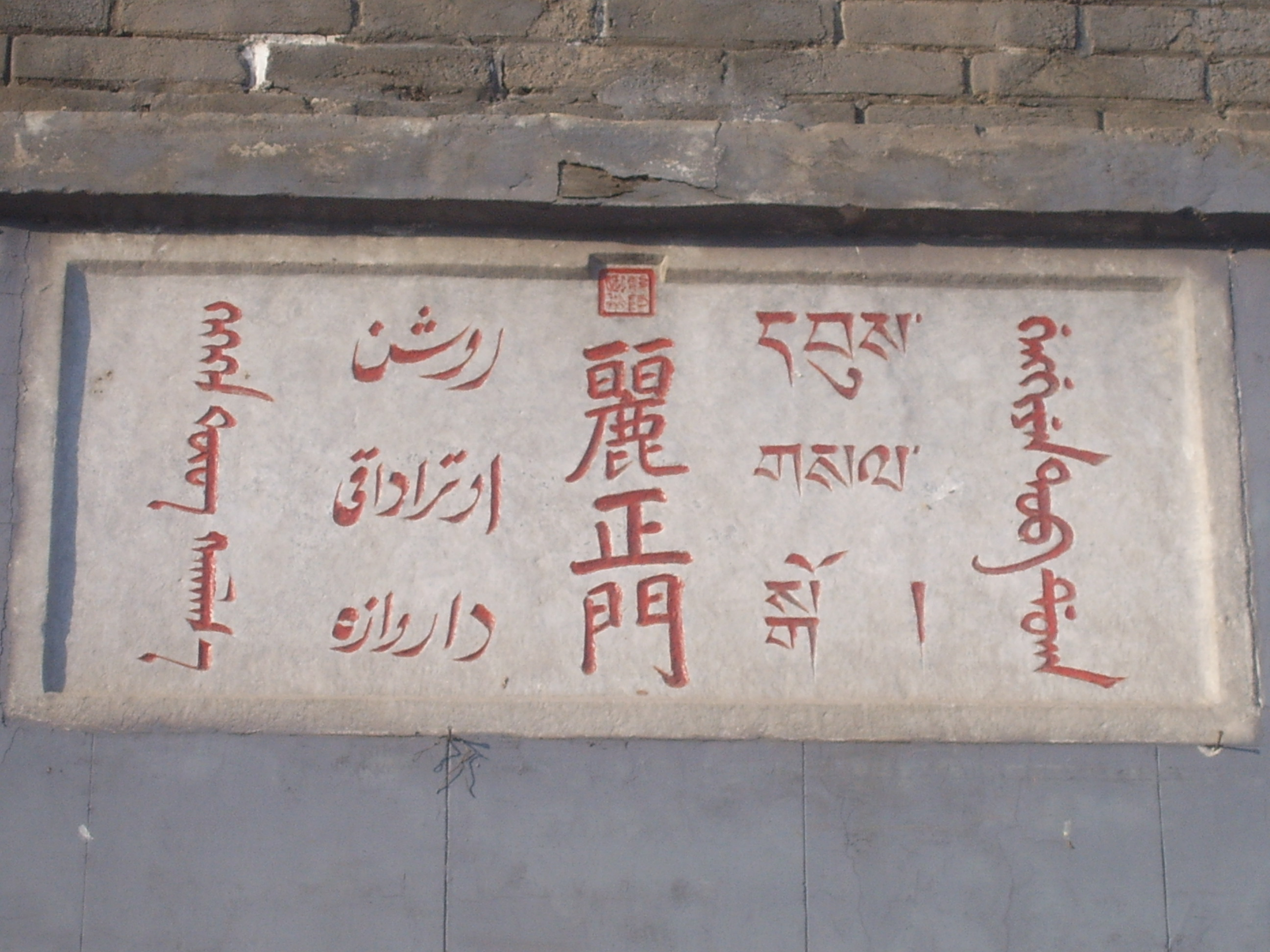
Lizheng Gate at the Chengde Mountain Resort. The second column from the left is the Chagatai language written in Perso-Arabic Nastaliq script which reads Rawshan Otturādaqi Darwāza.

== Etymology ==
The word Chagatai relates to the Chagatai Khanate (1225–1680s), a descendant empire of the Mongol Empire left to Genghis Khan's second son, Chagatai Khan. Many of the Turkic peoples who spoke this language claimed political descent from the Chagatai Khanate.

As part of the preparation for the 1924 establishment of the Soviet Republic of Uzbekistan, Chagatai was officially renamed "Old Uzbek", which Edward A. Allworth argued "badly distorted the literary history of the region" and was used to give authors such as Ali-Shir Nava'i an Uzbek identity. It was also referred to as "Turki" or "Sart" in Russian colonial sources. In China, it is sometimes called "ancient Uyghur".

== History ==
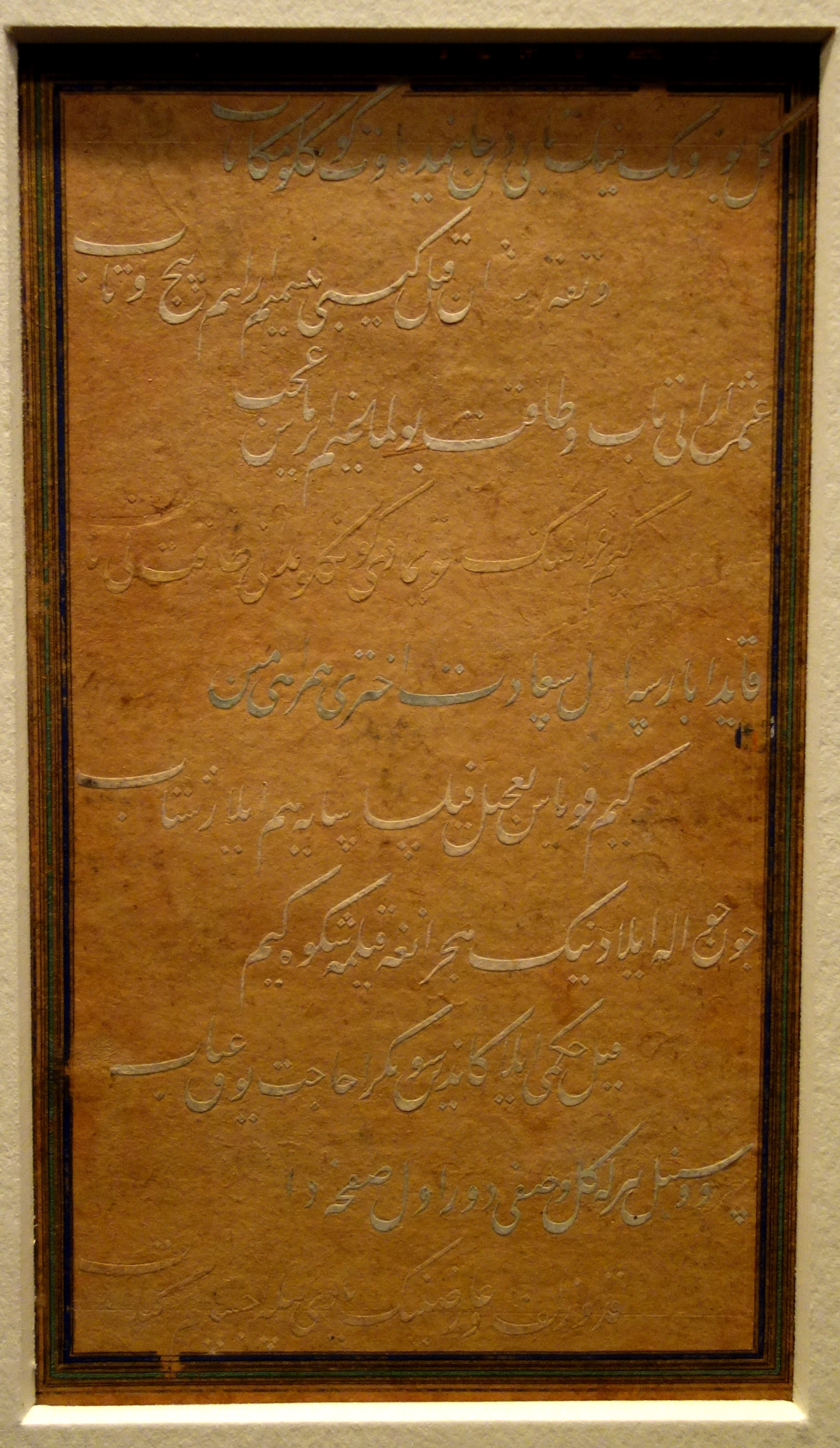
Late 15th century Chagatai Turkic text in Nastaliq script

In the twentieth century, the study of Chagatai suffered from nationalist bias. In the former Chagatai area, separate republics have been claiming Chagatai as the ancestor of their own brand of Turkic. Thus, Old Uzbek, Old Uyghur, Old Tatar, Old Turkmen, and a Chagatai-influenced layer in sixteenth-century Azerbaijanian have been studied separately from each other. There has been a tendency to disregard certain characteristics of Chagatai itself, e.g. its complex syntax copied from Persian. Chagatai developed in the late 15th century. It belongs to the Karluk branch of the Turkic language family. It is descended from Middle Turkic, which served as a lingua franca in Central Asia, with a strong infusion of Arabic and Persian words and turns of phrase.

Mehmet Fuat Köprülü divides Chagatai into the following periods:

1. Early Chagatai (13th–14th centuries)
2. Pre-classical Chagatai (the first half of the 15th century)
3. Classical Chagatai (the second half of the 15th century)
4. Continuation of Classical Chagatai (16th century)
5. Decline (17th–19th centuries)

The first period is a transitional phase characterized by the retention of archaic forms; the second phase began with the publication of Ali-Shir Nava'i's first divan and is the highpoint of Chagatai literature. According to Geoffrey Lewis, the writings of Nava'i raised Chagatai "to the status of literary language of Central Asia". This was followed by the third phase, which is characterized by two bifurcating developments. One is the preservation of the classical Chagatai language of Nava'i, the other the increasing influence of dialects of the local spoken languages.

== Influence on later Turkic languages ==
Uzbek and Uyghur, two modern languages descended from Chagatai, are the closest to it. Uzbeks regard Chagatai as the origin of their language and Chagatai literature as part of their heritage. In 1921 in Uzbekistan, then a part of the Soviet Union, Chagatai was initially intended to be the national and governmental language of the Uzbek SSR. However, when it became evident that the language was too archaic for that purpose, it was replaced by a new literary language based on a set of Uzbek dialects.

Ethnologue records the use of the word "Chagatai" in Afghanistan to describe the "Tekke" dialect of Turkmen. Up to and including the eighteenth century, Chagatai was the main literary language in Turkmenistan and most of Central Asia. While it had some influence on Turkmen, the two languages belong to different branches of the Turkic language family.

== Literature ==
=== 15th and 16th centuries ===
Persian literature, which Central Asian Turkic authors regarded as superior, was deliberately imitated and emulated in the creation of Chagatai literature. The most famous of Chagatai poets, Ali-Shir Nava'i, among other works wrote Muhakamat al-Lughatayn, a detailed comparison of Chagatai and New Persian. Here, Nava’i argued for the superiority of the former for literary purposes. His fame is attested by the fact that Chagatai is sometimes called "Nava'i's language". Among prose works, Timur's biography is written in Chagatai, as is the famous Baburnama (or Tuska Babure) of Babur, the Timurid founder of the Mughal Empire. A Divan attributed to Kamran Mirza is written in Persian and Chagatai, and one of Bairam Khan's Divans was written in Chagatai.

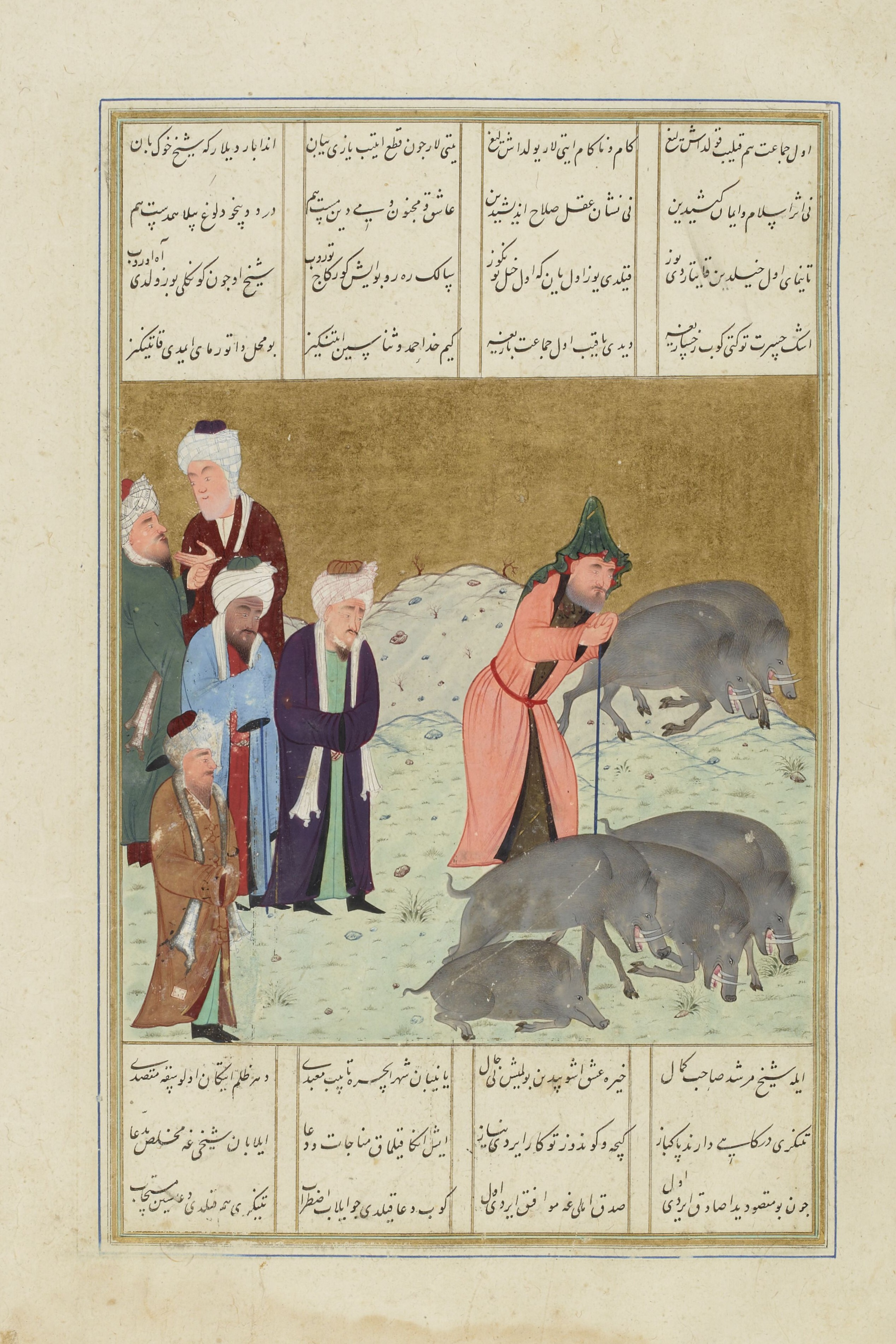
A 1553 manuscript copy of Ali-Shir Nava'i’s Chagatai verse translation of the story Shaykh Sanan and the Christian Maiden, which forms part of his mathnawi Lisan al-Tayr, a Turkic adaptation of Mantiq al-Tayr by Attar of Nishapur.

The following is a prime example of the 16th-century literary Chagatai Turkic, employed by Babur in one of his Ruba'is.

Islam ichin avara-i yazi buldim,
Kuffar u hind harbsazi buldim
Jazm aylab idim uzni shahid olmaqqa,
Amminna' lillahi ki gazi buldim

Translation:

I am become a desert wanderer for Islam,
Having joined battle with infidels and Hindus
I readied myself to become a martyr,
God be thanked I am become a ghazi.

Muhammad Shaybani, ruler of the nascent Khanate of Bukhara, wrote a prose essay called Risale-yi maarif-i Shaybāni in Chagatai in 1507 shortly after his capture of Greater Khorasan. He dedicated it to his son, Muhammad Timur. The manuscript of his philosophical and religious work, "Bahr ul-Khuda", written in 1508, is located in London.

Ötemish Hajji wrote a history of the Golden Horde entitled the Tarikh-i Dost Sultan in Khwarazm.

=== 17th and 18th centuries ===
In terms of literary production, the seventeenth and eighteenth centuries are often seen as a period of decay. It is a period in which Chagatai lost ground to Persian. Important writings in Chagatai from the period between the 17th and 18th centuries include those of Abu al-Ghazi Bahadur: Shajara-i Tarākima (Genealogy of the Turkmens) and Shajara-i Turk (Genealogy of the Turks). Abu al-Ghāzī is motivated by functional considerations and describes his choice of language and style in the sentence "I did not use one word of Chagatay (!), Persian or Arabic". As is clear from his actual language use, he aims at making himself understood to a broader readership by avoiding too ornate a style, notably saj’, rhymed prose. In the second half of the 18th century, Turkmen poet Magtymguly Pyragy also introduced the use of classical Chagatai into Turkmen literature as a literary language, incorporating many Turkmen linguistic features.

Bukharan ruler Subhan Quli Khan (1680–1702) was the author of a work on medicine, "Subkhankuli's revival of medicine" ("Ihya at-tibb Subhani"), which was written in the Central Asian Turkic language (Chagatai) and is devoted to the description of diseases, their recognition and treatment. One of the manuscript lists is kept in the library in Budapest.

=== 19th and 20th centuries ===
Prominent 19th-century Khivan writers include Shermuhammad Munis and his nephew Muhammad Riza Agahi. Muhammad Rahim Khan II of Khiva also wrote ghazals. Musa Sayrami's Tārīkh-i amniyya, completed in 1903, and its revised version Tārīkh-i ḥamīdi, completed in 1908, represent the best sources on the Dungan Revolt (1862–1877) in Xinjiang.

=== Dictionaries and grammars ===
The following are books written on the Chagatai language by natives and westerners:

- Vocabularium Linguae Giagataicae Sive Igureae (Lexico Ćiagataico)
- Muḥammad Mahdī Khān, Sanglakh.
- Abel Pavet de Courteille, Dictionnaire turk-oriental (1870).
- Ármin Vámbéry 1832–1913, Ćagataische Sprachstudien, enthaltend grammatikalischen Umriss, Chrestomathie, und Wörterbuch der ćagataischen Sprache; (1867).
- Sheykh Süleymān Efendi, Čagataj-Osmanisches Wörterbuch: Verkürzte und mit deutscher Übersetzung versehene Ausgabe (1902).
- Sheykh Süleymān Efendi, Lughat-ï chaghatay ve turkī-yi 'othmānī (Dictionary of Chagatai and Ottoman Turkish).
- Mirza Muhammad Mehdi Khan Astarabadi, Mabaniul Lughat: Yani Sarf o Nahv e Lughat e Chughatai.
- Abel Pavet de Courteille, Mirâdj-nâmeh : récit de l'ascension de Mahomet au ciel, composé a.h. 840 (1436/1437), texte turk-oriental, publié pour la première fois d'après le manuscript ouïgour de la Bibliothèque nationale et traduit en français, avec une préf. analytique et historique, des notes, et des extraits du Makhzeni Mir Haïder.

== Phonology ==
=== Consonants ===
		Labial	Alveolar		Palatal	Velar	Uvular	Glottal
Plosive/ Affricate	voiceless	p	t		t͡ʃ	k	q	ʔ
Plosive/ Affricate	voiced	b	d		d͡ʒ	ɡ		
Fricative	voiceless	f	s		ʃ		χ	h
Fricative	voiced	v	z		ʒ		ʁ	
Nasal		m	n			ŋ		
Tap/Trill			ɾ~r					
Approximant		w	l	ɫ	j			

Sounds /f, ʃ, χ, v, z, ɡ, ʁ, d͡ʒ, ʔ, l/ do not occur in initial position of words of Turkic origin.

=== Vowels ===
Vowels
	Front		Back	
	unrounded	rounded	unrounded	rounded
Close	i iː	y	ɯ	u uː
Mid	e eː	ø		o oː
Open	æ		ɑ ɑː	

Vowel length is distributed among five vowels /iː, eː, ɑː, oː, uː/.

== Orthography ==
Chagatai has been a literary language and is written with a variation of the Perso-Arabic alphabet. This variation is known as Kona Yëziq, (transl. old script). It saw usage for Kazakh, Kyrgyz, Uyghur, and Uzbek.

Isolated	Final	Medial	Initial	Uzbek Letter name	Uzbek Latin	Kazakh	Kyrgyz	Uyghur	Uyghur Latin	Bashkir	Kazan Tatar	Common Turkic Alphabet
ﺀ	—			Hamza	'	∅	∅	ئ	'	∅	∅	∅
ﺍ	ﺎ		ﺍ	alif	О о А а	А а Ә ә	А а	ئا	А а	А а	А а	A a
ﺏ	ﺐ	ﺒ	ﺑ	be	B b	Б б	Б б	ﺏ	B b	Б б	Б б	B b
ﭖ	ﭗ	ﭙ	ﭘ	pe	P p	П п	П п	ﭖ	P p	П п	П п	P p
ﺕ	ﺖ	ﺘ	ﺗ	te	T t	Т т	Т т	ﺕ	T t	Т т	Т т	T t
ﺙ	ﺚ	ﺜ	ﺛ	se	S s	С с	С с	س	S s	Ҫ ҫ	С с	S s (Ś ś)
ﺝ	ﺞ	ﺠ	ﺟ	jim	J j	Ж ж	Ж ж	ﺝ	J j	Й й	Җ җ	C c
ﭺ	ﭻ	ﭽ	ﭼ	chim	Ch ch	Ш ш	Ч ч	ﭺ	Ch ch	С с	Ч ч	Ç ç
ﺡ	ﺢ	ﺤ	ﺣ	hoy-i hutti	H h	X x	X x	ھ	H h	Х х	Х х	H h
ﺥ	ﺦ	ﺨ	ﺧ	xe	X x	Қ қ (Х х)	К к (Х х)	ﺥ	X x	Х х	Х х	X x
ﺩ	ﺪ		ﺩ	dol	D d	Д д	Д д	ﺩ	D d	Д д	Д д	D d
ﺫ	ﺬ		ﺫ	zol	Z z	З з	З з	ذ	Z z	Ҙ ҙ	З з	Z z (Ź ź)
ﺭ	ﺮ		ﺭ	re	R r	Р р	Р р	ﺭ	R r	Р р	Р р	R r
ﺯ	ﺰ		ﺯ	ze	Z z	З з	З з	ﺯ	Z z	З з	З з	Z z
ﮊ	ﮋ		ﮊ	je (zhe)	J j	Ж ж	Ж ж	ﮊ	Zh zh	Ж ж	Ж ж	J j
ﺱ	ﺲ	ﺴ	ﺳ	sin	S s	С с	С с	ﺱ	S s	С с	С с	S s
ﺵ	ﺶ	ﺸ	ﺷ	shin	Sh sh	С с	Ш ш	ﺵ	Sh sh	Ш ш	Ш ш	Ş ş
ﺹ	ﺺ	ﺼ	ﺻ	sod	S s	С с	С с	س	S s	С с	С с	S s
ﺽ	ﺾ	ﻀ	ﺿ	dod	Z z	З з	З з	ز	Z z	Ҙ ҙ	З з	Z z
ﻁ	ﻂ	ﻄ	ﻃ	to (itqi)	T t	Т т	Т т	ت	T t	Т т	Т т	T t
ﻅ	ﻆ	ﻈ	ﻇ	zo (izgʻi)	Z z	З з	З з	ز	Z z	Ҙ ҙ	З з	Z z (Ź ź)
ﻉ	ﻊ	ﻌ	ﻋ	ayn	'	Ғ ғ	∅	ئ	'	Ғ ғ	Г г	Ğ ğ
ﻍ	ﻎ	ﻐ	ﻏ	ğayn	Gʻ gʻ	Ғ ғ	Г г	ﻍ	Gh gh	Ғ ғ	Г г	Ğ ğ
ﻑ	ﻒ	ﻔ	ﻓ	fe	F f	П п	П п/Б б	ﻑ	F f	Ф ф	Ф ф	F f
ﻕ	ﻖ	ﻘ	ﻗ	qof	Q q	Қ қ	К к	ﻕ	Q q	Ҡ ҡ	К к	Q q
ک	ک	ﻜ	ﻛ	kof	K k	К к	К к	ك	K k	К к	К к	K k
ﮒ	ﮓ	ﮕ	ﮔ	gof	G g	Г г	Г г	ﮒ	G g	Г г	Г г	G g
ݣ	ـنگ/ـݣ	ـنگـ/ـݣـ	نگـ/ݣـ	nungof	Ng ng	Ң ң	Ң ң	ڭ	Ng ng	Ң ң	Ң ң	Ñ ñ
ﻝ	ﻞ	ﻠ	ﻟ	lam	L l	Л л	Л л	ﻝ	L l	Л л	Л л	L l
ﻡ	ﻢ	ﻤ	ﻣ	mim	M m	М м	М м	ﻡ	M m	М м	М м	M m
ﻥ	ﻦ	ﻨ	ﻧ	nun	N n	Н н	Н н	ﻥ	N n	Н н	Н н	N n
ﻭ	ﻮ		ﻭ	vav	V v U u, Oʻ oʻ	У у Ұ ұ, Ү ү О о, Ө ө	У у, Ү ү О о, Ө ө	ۋ ئۆ/ئو, ئۈ/ئۇ	W w U u, O o, Ü ü, Ö ö	О о, Ө ө, У у, Ү ү	О о, Ө ө, У у, Ү ү	O o, Ö ö, U u, Ü ü, V v, W w
ﻩ	ﻪ	ﻬ	ﻫ	hoy-i havvaz	H h A a	Һ һ Э э, е	∅ Э э, е	ھ ئە/ئا	H h A a, E e	Һ һ, Ә ә	Һ һ, Ә ә	H h, Ä ä
ﻯ	ﻰ	ﻴ	ﻳ	ye	Y y Е e, I i	Й й, И и Ы ы, І і	Й й Ы ы, И и	ي ئى، ئې	Y y Ë ë, I i	Й й, И и, Ы ы, Э э	Й й, И и, Ы ы, Э э	Y y, İ i, I ı, E e

=== Notes ===
The letters ف، ع، ظ، ط، ض، ص، ژ، ذ، خ، ح، ث، ء are only used in loanwords and do not represent any additional phonemes.

For Kazakh and Kyrgyz, letters in parentheses () indicate a modern borrowed pronunciation from Bashkir or Tatar that is not consistent with historic Kazakh and Kyrgyz treatments of these letters

=== Influence ===
Many orthographies, particularly that of Turkic languages, are based on Kona Yëziq. Examples include the alphabets of South Azerbaijani, Qashqai, Chaharmahali, Khorasani, Uyghur, Äynu, and Khalaj.
Virtually all other Turkic languages have a history of being written with an alphabet descended from Kona Yëziq, however, due to various writing reforms conducted by Turkey and the Soviet Union, many of these languages now are written in either the Latin script or the Cyrillic script.

The Qing dynasty commissioned dictionaries on the major languages of China which included Chagatai Turki, such as the Pentaglot Dictionary.

== Grammar ==
=== Word order ===
The basic word order of Chagatai is SOV. Chagatai is a head-final language where the adjectives come before nouns. Other words such as those denoting location, time, etc. usually appear in the order of emphasis put on them.

=== Vowel and consonant harmony ===
Like other Turkic languages, Chagatai has vowel harmony (though Uzbek, despite being a direct descendant of Chaghatai, notably does not ever since the spelling changes under the USSR; vowel harmony is present in the orthography of the Uzbek Perso-Arabic script). There are mainly eight vowels, and vowel harmony system works upon vowel backness.

Back vowels	a	u	o	i, e
Front vowels	ä	ü	ö	i, e

The vowels [i] and [e] are central or front-central/back-central and therefore are considered both. Usually these will follow two rules in inflection: [i] and [e] almost always follow the front vowel inflections; and, if the stem contains [q] or [ǧ], which are formed in the back of the mouth, back vowels are more likely in the inflection.

These affect the suffixes that are applied to words.

Consonant harmony is relatively less common and only appears in a few suffixes such as the genitive.

=== Number ===
Plural is formed by adding the suffix -لار (-lar/lär). There are two pronunciations which exist due vowel harmony rules. If the vowel of the last syllable is a front syllable ([a], [o], [u]) -lar is used. If the vowel is a back vowel ([ä], [ö], [ü]) or [i] and [e], -lär is used. In rare circumstances -lar is sometimes written as -لر, though generally the suffix -لار is used for both the pronunciations /-lär/ and /-lar/. Or in the case of Kazakh and Kyrgyz /-ler/ and /-lar/.

=== Cases ===
Chagatai has six different cases. The nominative and sometimes the accusative does not have any special marking.

	Affix	اوتون otun firewood	اينك inäk cow	Notes
Nominative	–	اوتون otun A/The firewood...	اينك inäk A/The cow...	Nominative is unmarked and usually comes first in a sentence.
Genitive	-نينک -niŋ	اوتوننينک otunniŋ...a/the firewood’s...	اينكنينک inəkniñ...a/the cow’s...	The possessed object must be inflected with third person possessive pronouns 'ى/سى' (si/i).
Accusative	-نى -ni	اوتوننى otunni...the firewood.	اينكنى inəkni...the cow.	Accusative case only takes effect in the case that the direct object is “definite”. So 'a road' is <yol> but 'the road' is <yolni>.
Dative	-غه/كه -ka/ǧa	اوتونغه otunǧa...to the firewood...	اينككه inäkka...to the cow...	To be noted is that the ending varies from word to word due to consonant harmony, which changes may be included in writing or not, so <inäk> + <ǧa> = <inäkka> but may be written as <inäkǧa>. Vowel harmony is taken into effect if the vowel of the last syllable is a front vowel the suffix attains pronunciation of -ä instead of -a.
Ablative	-دين -din	اوتوندين otundin...from the firewood...	اينكدين/اينكتين inäkdin/inäktin...from the cow...	The case marking for ablative is occasionally rendered as -دهن or -دان (dan/dän), and can become -تين (tin) before a voiceless consonants.
Locative	-ده -da/dä	اوتونده otunda...in/on the firewood...	اينكده inäkdä...in/on the cow...	Like the dative the locative works through vowel harmony; of the vowel of the final syllable is a front syllable the suffix turns to -dä.

=== Pronouns ===
==== Personal Pronouns ====
There are seven Chagatai personal pronouns, as there are formal and informal forms of the second person singular form. Unlike other languages these pronouns do not differ between genders. Each of these pronouns have suffixes added to end of verbs as conjugation.

Number	Singular	Conjugational suffix	Plural	Conjugational suffix
First person	من män	-من -män	بيز biz	-ميز -miz
Second person	سيز siz [formal]	-سيز -siz	سيزلار sizlär	-سيزلار -sizlär
Second person	سن sän [informal]	سن -sän	سيزلار sizlär	-سيزلار -sizlär
Third person	او/اول ul/u	-	اولار ular	-لار -lar

== Punctuation ==
Below are some punctuation marks associated with Chagatai.

Symbol/ Graphemes	Name	English name	Function
⁘		Four-dot mark	The four-dot mark indicates a verse break. It is used at the beginning and end of a verse, especially to separate verse from prose. It may occur at the beginning or end of lines, or in the middle of a page.
❊		Eight teardrop-spoked propeller asterisk	The eight teardrop-spoked propeller asterisk indicates a decoration for title. This mark occurs end of the title. This mark also occurs end of a poem. This mark occurs end of a prayer in Jarring texts. However this mark did not occur consistently.
.		Period (full stop)	The period is a punctuation mark placed at the end of a sentence. However, this mark did not occur consistently in Chagatai manuscripts until the later period (e.g. manuscripts on Russian paper).
" "		Quotation mark	Dialogue was wrapped in quotation marks, rarely used for certain words with emphasis.
___		Underscore	Usually with red ink, occurs on the top of names, prayers, and highlighted questions, answers, and important outline numbers.
		Whitespace	Can indicate a stanza break in verse, and a new paragraph in brows.
-		Dash	Used for number ranges (e.g. 2–5).
--		Double dash	Sets off following information like a colon, it is used to list a table of contents.
( )		Parentheses	Marks a tangential or contextual remark, word or phrase.
:		Colon	Colons appear extremely rarely preceding a direct quote. Colons can also mark beginning of dialogue.
...		Ellipsis	A series of dots (typically 3) that indicate missing text.

== Bibliography ==
- Bodrogligeti, András J. E. (2007) [2001]. A Grammar of Chagatay. Languages of the World: Materials. Vol. 155. München: LINCOM Europa. ISBN 978-3-89586-563-3.
- Cakan, Varis (2011). "Chagatai Turkish and Its Effects on Central Asian Culture" (PDF). 大阪大学世界言語研究センター論集. 6: 143–158. hdl:11094/12239. Archived from the original (PDF) on 2016-12-19.
- Eckmann, Janos (1997). Chagatay Manual. Taylor & Francis. ISBN 978-0-7007-0860-4.
- Erkinov, Aftandil (2008). Woo, C.H. (ed.). "Persian-Chaghatay Bilingualism in the Intellectual Circles of Central Asia during the 15th–18th Centuries (the case of poetical anthologies, bayāz)" (PDF). International Journal of Central Asian Studies. 12: 57–82. Archived from the original (PDF) on 2020-07-11.
- Pavet de Courteille, Abel (1972) [1870]. Dictionnaire Turk-Oriental: Destinée principalement à faciliter la lecture des ouvrages de Bâber, d'Aboul-Gâzi, de Mir Ali-Chir Nevâï, et d'autres ouvrages en langues touraniennes [Eastern Turkish Dictionary: Intended Primarily to Facilitate the Reading of the Works of Babur, Abu'l Ghazi, Mir ʿAli Shir Navaʾi, and Other Works in Turanian Languages]. Amsterdam: Philo Press. ISBN 90-6022-113-3.
- Péri, Benedek (2025). "Chapter 11: Bābur and the History of a Cross-Linguistic Poetic Imitation Network". In Csirkes, Ferenc; Péri, Benedek (eds.). Mongols, Tatars, and Turks in the Persianate World: Essays in Honor of István Vásáry. Brill Publishers. pp. 253–279. ISBN 978-9004720671.
