= Edward A. Allworth bibliography =

Edward A. Allworth was an American historian specializing in Central Asia. Allwarth is widely regarded as the West’s leading scholar on Central Asian studies. He extensively studied the various ethnic groups of the region, including Uzbeks, Tajiks, and Bukharan Jews. He wrote numerous books on the history of Central Asia.

== Books by Allworth ==
Publications
Year	Book	Notes	Publisher
1964	Uzbek Literary Politics		Mouton & Company
1965	Central Asian Publishing and the Rise of Nationalism	An essay and a list of publications in the New York Public Library	The New York Public Library
1967	Central Asia: A Century of Russian Rule		Columbia University Press
1971	Soviet Nationality Problems	Coauthored by Alexandre Bennigsen	Columbia University Press
1971	The Nationalities of the Soviet East: Publications and Writing Systems	A bibliographical directory and transliteration tables for Iranian-and Turkic-language publications, 1818-1945, located in U.S. libraries	Columbia University Press
1973	The Nationality Question in Soviet Central Asia		Praeger Publishers
1976	Soviet Asia Bibliographies: Compilation of Social Science and Humanities Sources on the Iranian, Mongolian and Turkic Nationalities		Praeger Publishers
1977	Nationality Group Survival in Multi-ethnic States: Shifting Support Patterns in the Soviet Baltic Region	Edited by Edward A. Allworth	Praeger Publishers
1980	Ethnic Russia in the USSR: The Dilemma of Dominance		Pergamon Press
1983	The Search for Group Identity in Turkistan, March 1917-September 1922		Canadian-American Slavic Studies
1989	Central Asia	Edited by Edward A. Allworth	Duke University Press
1989	Central Asia: 120 years of Russian Rule		Duke University Press
1990	The Modern Uzbeks: From the Fourteenth Century to the Present		Hoover Institution Press
1994	Central Asia: One Hundred Thirty Years of Russian Dominance		Duke University Press
1996	The Rediscovery of Central Asia: The Region Reflected in Two Collections of the New York Public Library		The New York Public Library
1998	Nation-Building in the Post-Soviet Borderlands: The Politics of National Identities	Coauthored by Graham Smith, Vivien Law, Andrew Wilson, and Annette Bohr	Cambridge University Press
1998	The Tatars of Crimea: Return to the Homeland		Duke University Press
2000	The Preoccupations of Abdalrauf Fitrat, Bukharan Nonconformist: An Analysis and List of His Writings		Das Arabische Buch
2002	Evading Reality: The Devices of Abdalrauf Fitrat, Modern Central Asian Reformist		Brill Academic Publishers
2003	The Personal History of a Bukharan Intellectual: The Diary of Muhammad Sharif-I Sadr-I Ziya	Edited by Edward A. Allworth	Brill Academic Publishers
