= Tajbakhsh =

Tajbakhsh (Persian: تاجبخش) is a Persian surname. Notable persons with this name include:

- Aryan Tajbakhsh (born 1990), English footballer
- Kian Tajbakhsh (born 1962), Iranian-American scholar, social scientist and urban planner
- Shahrbanou Tadjbakhsh (born 1965), Iranian-American researcher
- Shahragim Tajbakhsh, Research Scientist at Institut Pasteur, France
