= Muhakamat al-Lughatayn =

1499 book by Ali-Shir Nava'i

Muhakamat al-Lughatayn (Arabic: مُحَاكَمَةُ اللُغَتَيْن, lit. 'Comparison of the Two Languages'), was one of Mir Ali-Shir Nava'i's works. Despite its Arabic title, the book was originally written in Chagatai. It was completed in December 1499, and defended Nava'i's view that the Chagatai Turkic language was superior to Persian for literary purposes. It was the writer's last definitive statement on the subject dearest to his heart, and the Muhakamat is a perfect example of an author's final work being his last will and testament as well, which was to emphasize the importance of his native language.

Repeatedly, Nava'i emphasizes his belief in the richness, precision and malleability of Turkic vocabulary as opposed to Persian. For example:

- Turks have a word for the beauty mark on a woman's face, but there is no comparable word in Persian.
- Many Chagatai words have three or four or more meanings; Persian, according to Nava'i, lacks such flexible words.
- Turkic languages have nine words used to identify separate species of duck, which illustrates the capacity of the Turkic languages to make more precise distinctions. Persian, he claims, has but one word that covers all of these.

Arguments of this nature fill page after page of the Muhakamat. Below is an extract from this major work:

I realized the necessity of giving thought to Turkish words. The world which came into view was more sublime than 18,000 worlds, and its adorned sky, which I came to know, was higher than nine skies. There I found a treasury of ... excellence in which the pearls were more lustrous than the stars. I entered the rose garden. Its roses were more splendid than the stars of heaven, its hallowed ground was untouched by hand or foot, and its myriad wonders were safe from the touch of other hands.

This, however, does not reflect modern standards of linguistic studies. Robert Devereux, the western translator of the work, writes:

Any linguist of today who reads the essay will inevitably conclude that Nawa'i argued his case poorly, for his principal argument is that the Turkic lexicon contained many words for which the Persian had no exact equivalents and that Persian-speakers had therefore to use the Turkic words. This is a weak reed on which to lean, for it is a rare language indeed that contains no loan words. In any case, the beauty of a language and its merits as a literary medium depend less on size of vocabulary and purity of etymology that on the euphony, expressiveness and malleability of those words its lexicon does include. Moreover, even if Nawa'i's thesis were to be accepted as valid, he destroyed his own case by the lavish use, no doubt unknowingly, of non-Turkic words even while ridiculing the Persians for their need to borrow Turkic words. The present writer has not made a word count of Nawa'i's text, but he would estimate conservatively that at least one half the words used by Nawa'i in the essay are Arabic or Persian in origin. To support his claim of the superiority of the Turkic language, Nawa'i also employs the curious argument that most Turks also spoke Persian but only a few Persians ever achieved fluency in Turkic. It is difficult to understand why he was impressed by this phenomenon, since the most obvious explanation is that Turks found it necessary, or at least advisable, to learn Persian - it was, after all, the official state language - while Persians saw no reason to bother learning Turkic which was, in their eyes, merely the uncivilized tongue of uncivilized nomadic tribesmen.
