= Abu'l-Fadl Harawi =

Medieval Persian astronomer

Abu'l-Fadl Harawi (Persian: ابو الفضل هروى) (also called Abu al-Fadl al-Harawi, Abufadlus Harwanensis) was a 10th-century astronomer who, along with al-Khujandi, studied under the patronage of the Buyid dynasty in Ray, Iran. The nisba "Harawi" suggests that he was originally from Herat, in ancient times also known as Haraiva.

== See also ==
- List of Iranian scientists
