= Shahrbanou Tadjbakhsh =

Iranian-American scholar

Shahrbanou Tadjbakhsh PhD
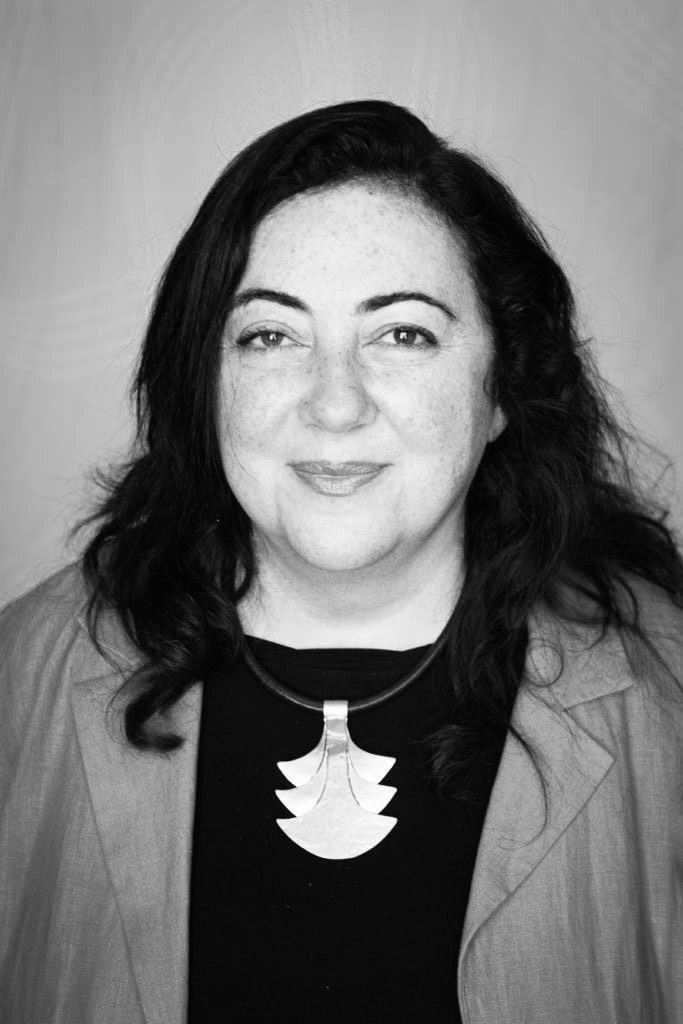
- Shahrbanou Tadjbakhsh
- Born: December 5, 1965 (age 60); Tehran
- Occupations: Researcher, lecturer, consultant
- Years active: 1995–Present
- Known for: Human security, Peacebuilding in Central Asia and Afghanistan

Academic background
- Education: Georgetown University
- Alma mater: Columbia University
- Thesis: The A-Soviet Woman of the Muslim East and Nativization in Tajikistan (1994)
- Doctoral advisor: Edward A. Allworth

Academic work
- Discipline: History, Sociology, Anthropology, Political Science, Cultural Studies
- Notable works: Human Security: Concepts and Implications (2007)
- Notable ideas: "Human Security"
- Website: https://sciences-po.academia.edu/shahrbanoutadjbakhsh

Shahrbanou Tadjbakhsh (Persian شهربانو تاجبخش) (born 1965) is an Iranian-American researcher, university lecturer, and United Nations consultant in peacebuilding, conflict resolution, counter-terrorism, and radicalization, best known for her work in "Human Security" and for contributions in the republics of Central Asia and Afghanistan, as cited by the New York Times and other publications as well as hundreds of scholarly publications. Currently, she is a lecturer at Sciences Po, researcher, and consultant to the United Nations.

== Personal life and education ==
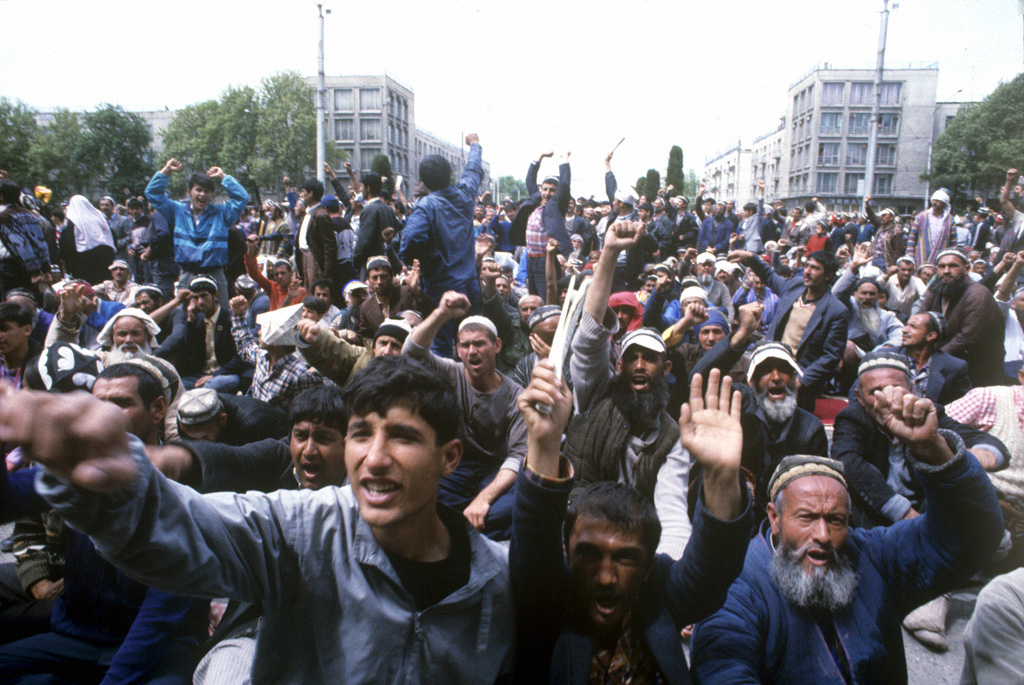
Tadjbakhsh studied the Tajikistani Civil War: here, rally at Shakhidon Square, Dushanbe (1992)

Shahrbanou Tadjbakhsh was born on December 5, 1965, in Iran.

In 1987, she received a BA from Georgetown University. In 1991 she earned an MA and in 1994 a doctorate from Columbia University plus certificate from Columbia's Harriman Institute. Her doctoral thesis was "The A-Soviet Woman of the Muslim East and Nativization in Tajikistan" (1994), supervised by Edward A. Allworth.

Tadjbakhsh resides currently in France.

== Career in academia and United Nations ==
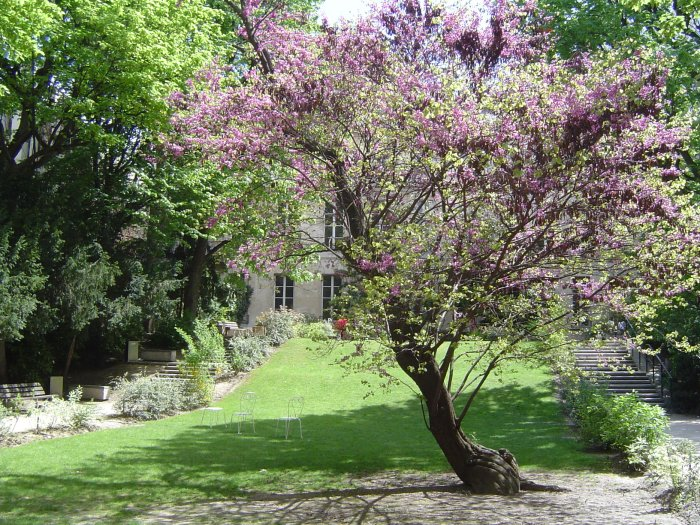
Tadjbakhsh teaches at Sciences Po: here, garden at rues Saint-Guillaume and des Saints-Pères

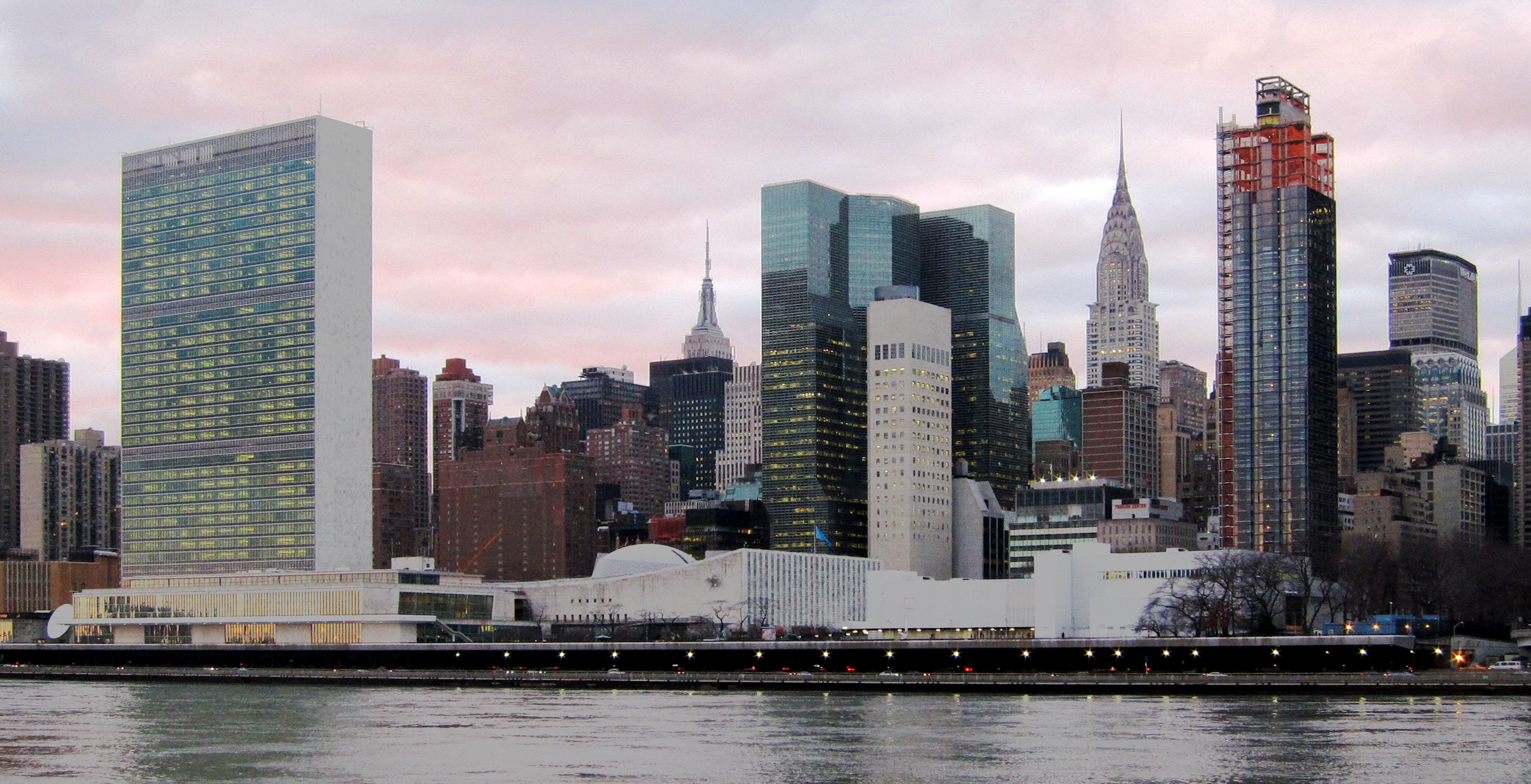
Tadjbakhsh has worked at UN HQ in NYC.

Tadjbakhsh has been teaching at l’Institute d’Etudes Politiques (Sciences Po) since 2003. Currently she is teaching a course on Human Security and a course on Understanding and Responding to Violent Extremism, both at the Master's of International Security at Sciences Po. She also runs a summer course on Human Security at the Summer School since 2017 at Sciences Po.

Ongoing UN PBC and PBF projects Ongoing UN PBF projects include Kyrgyzstan

She also currently works with various entities of the United Nations as a consultant on peacebuilding, counter-terrorism, and prevention of violent extremism and radicalization.

=== Contribution to Human Security studies ===
Tadjbakhsh works with the Peace Research Institute Oslo (PRIO)

Tadjbakhsh is a thought leader in the field of Human Security studies, both as an academic subject and as a policy field. She has been teaching one of the longest running university courses on the subject at the Institute of Political Studies (Sciences Po) in Paris since 2003, in addition to running a summer program at Sciences Po since 2007.

Her co-authored book "Human Security: Concepts and Implications" should be, in the words of a reviewer, compulsory text for all those interested in serious academic discussions on the subject. As a proponent of the broad approach to Human Security, she advocates for the definition that not only encompasses freedom from fear but also freedom from want and indignity. In 2004, Tadjbakhsh founded Journal of Human Security (la revue de Sécurité Humaine) at Sciences Po, which ran through 2008.

She has written numerous monograms and articles, contributed to the development of training manuals at the United Nations and has trained UN workers, government officials and practitioners on the Human Security approach and its policy and programming implications. In collaboration with the UN's Human Security Unit (New York), she prepared a training manual for operationalizing human security as a concept. She also contributed to the reports of the UN Secretary General on Human Security which led to a General Assembly Resolution in 2012.

In May 2013, Tadjbakhsh delivered a Kapuscinski Lecture sponsored by UNDP and the European Commission on the theme of Human Security, delivered at the University of Riga and the Stockholm School of Economics in Riga, Latvia. In 2021, she was interviewed for a podcast on spotify on what humanizing people meant for security.

=== Expertise on Afghanistan and Central Asia ===
She is best known for her work on Central Asia and Afghanistan. Her writing on Central Asia was recommended for The New York Review of Books by Ahmed Rashid as part of what people should know about Central Asia. She has written about cross-border communities across Central Asia and Afghanistan. Between 2010 and 2016 she was a researcher at the Peace Research Institute Oslo (PRIO) working on Regional Security Complexes around Afghanistan which resulted in a book co-written with Kristian Berg Harpviken on Afghanistan: A Rock Between Hard Places. She also conducted research on the ethics of liberal peace and edited a book on Rethinking the Liberal Peace. She and her students conducted a joint research between Sciences Po and Kabul University in 2007. In 2015, she participated at the OSCE Security Days conference focusing on Contemporary Challenges to Euro-Atlantic Security hosted by the Wilson Center and talked about Enhancing Security and Stability in Afghanistan and Central Asia.

=== Contributions to the field of understanding violent extremism and countering terrorism ===
Tadjbakhsh is also known for her expertise in the field of counterterrorism and prevention of violent extremism, especially in Central Asia and Afghanistan. She has been teaching a course on Understanding and Responding to Violent Extremism at the Master's of International Security at Sciences Po since 2018. Between 2010-2019, she was a consultant with the UN Regional Center for Preventive Diplomacy in Central Asia (UNRCCA) and the UN Office on Counter Terrorism (UNOCT), and helped prepare the Joint Plan of Action for the Implementation of the UN Global Counter Strategy in Central Asia, adopted in November 2011 and revised and updated in 2021. In January 2018, she worked as an Advisor to the Permanent Mission of Kazakhstan to the United Nations on their Presidency of the United Nations Security Council to help with resolutions and statements on counter-terrorism and on Afghanistan. She helped the Government of Kazakhstan prepare the Code of Conduct for A World Free of Terrorism that was then adopted by 70 countries at the United Nations.

Since 2017, she has collaborated on numerous projects for the Organization for Security and Cooperation in Europe (OSCE), including helping prepare the Guidebook on a government-civil society collaboration on countering and preventing violent extremism and radicalization that leads to terrorism and conducting training for journalists and the youth on countering the use of the Internet for terrorist purposes through alternative narrative development.

== Teaching and research ==
She has taught as an adjunct associate professor at Georgetown University, at Columbia University's School of International and Public Affairs and a visiting scholar at the Harriman Institute for post-Soviet Studies through (2003–2004) and has been delivered lectures as a visiting professor at various universities in Tehran, at Kabul University, at Jamia Islamiya University (Jamia-tul-Madina) and at Jawaharlal Nehru University in India, at the University of Pretoria in South Africa, at the Russian Center for Strategic Research and International Studies]] in Russia, and at the Academy of Sciences of the Republic of Tajikistan.

Since 2014, she has been academic advisor to the Afghan Institute for Strategic Studies (AISS) and has provided guidance for the research and publication of a series of papers on radicalization in Afghanistan. With the AISS, she has been developing a concept of security based on sufism and love, as part of a project on developing the Herat School of Security.

Tadjbakhsh has served on the board of governors of Jacobs University Bremen (International University of Bremen, Germany) between (2008–2010). She has also served on editorial boards of the Journal of Conflict Transformation and Security, University of Manchester (2012 – Present), Les Cahiers de l’Orient (2007–2008), Central Asia Monitor (1993–2000), and the Afghan Institute for Strategic Studies (since 2015).

== United Nations ==
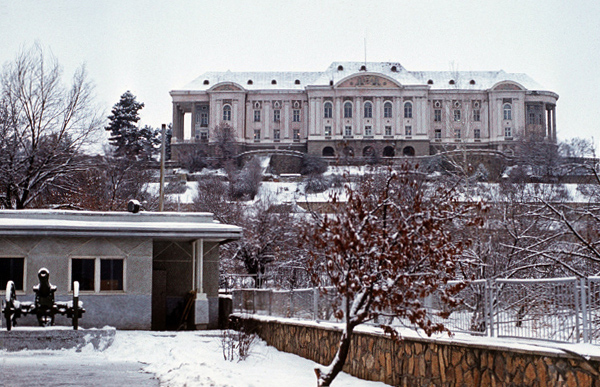
Tadjbakhsh was a student during the Soviet-Afghan War: here, Tajbeg Palace as Red Army HQ (1982)

Tadjbakhsh served on the staff of the United Nations Development Program (UNDP) from 1997 to 2003 and since then has collaborated with UN agencies as a consultant, including the Political Affairs, UN Regional Center for Preventive Diplomacy (under DPPA), United Nations Counter-Terrorism Office and United Nations Economic and Social Commission for Asia and the Pacific (UNESCAP), as well as the Organization for Security and Co-operation in Europe (OSCE). In 2000, while working at the Human Development Report Office at UNDP headquarters (New York City), Tadjbakhsh set up the National Human Development Report (NHDR) Unit in 2000 and ran a Community of Practice Network on Human Development. In 2003, Tadjbakhsh left the UN but has continued to contribute to UN Human Development Reports. She led team in preparing Human Development Reports on South Eastern Europe, Afghanistan, Pakistan, Iraq, Iran, Nepal and South East Europe She also worked with teams in preparing Human Development Reports for Bosnia and Herzegovina, Djibouti, and Mongolia among others.

The first UNDP/Government National Human Development Report for Afghanistan, published in 2004, for which Tadjbakhsh served as editor in chief, received notice by New York Times as the "first comprehensive look at the state of development in Afghanistan in 30 years." More than 15 years prior to the US pull-out from Afghanistan in 2021, the report warned, "In addition to ranking Afghanistan in the development index for the first time, the report warned that Afghanistan could revert to anarchy if its dire poverty, poor health and insecurity were not improved. 'The fragile nation could easily tumble back into chaos,' concluded the authors of the study, led by Shahrbanou Tadjbakhsh."

Since 2010, Tadjbakhsh has been a consultant for the United Nations Regional Center for Preventive Diplomacy in Central Asia (UNRCCA) and the UN Office of Counter Terrorism, for whom she has engaged in preparing the Action Plan for Implementation of the UN Global Counter-Terrorism Strategy (UNGCTS) in Central Asia. In January 2018, she worked with the Permanent Mission of Kazakhstan to the United Nations on their Presidency of the United Nations Security Council to help with resolutions and statements on counter-terrorism and on Afghanistan.

== Selected bibliography ==
Tadjbakhsh's work appears in detail on WorldCat. They include:

=== Books ===
- Tadjbakhsh, Shahrbanou; Harpviken, Kristian Berg (2016). A Rock Between Hard Places : Afghanistan as an Arena of Regional Insecurity. Oxford University Press. doi:10.1093/acprof:oso/9780190627232.001.0001. ISBN 978-0-19-062723-2.
- Editor, Rethinking the Liberal Peace: External Models and Local Alternatives, edited by Shahrbanou Tadjbakhsh, (New York: Routledge, 2011)
- Tadjbakhsh, Shahrbanou (2007). Human Security Concepts and implications. Routledge. p. 292. ISBN 978-0-415-47338-5.
- Tadjbakhsh, Shahrbanou; Harpviken, Kristian Berg (2012). Afghanistan and its Neighborhood : Continuity and Change. Oxford University Press. doi:10.1093/acprof:oso/9780190627232.003.0005.

=== Chapters, articles, other ===
- Tadjbakhsh, Shahrbanou; Schoiswohl, Michael (2008). "Playing with Fire? The International Community's Democratization Experiment in Afghanistan". International Peacekeeping. 15 (2): 252–267. doi:10.1080/13533310802041535. ISSN 1743-906X. S2CID 153926270.
- "Conceptualizing love for peace from below: humane security in Afghanistan (Open Democracy, 12 july 2019)
- Ṣadr-I ̮Ziyā and his Diary Leiden | Boston: Brill, 2004. ISBN 978-9-004-13161-3
- Babel: widows of Tajikistan Index on Censorship. March-April, 1998, Vol. 27 Issue 2, p163, 6 p.ISSN 0306-4220
- "Iran and its Relationship with Afghanistan After the Nuclear Deal" with Mohammed Fazeli (PRIO, 2016)
- "Regional Responses to Radicalization in Afghanistan: Obstacles, Opportunities and an Agenda for Action" (PRIO, 2016)
- "Strangers Across the Amu River: Community Perceptions Along the Tajik–Afghan Borders" with Kosimsho Iskandarov and Abdul Ahad Mohammadi (Stockholm: SIPRI/OSF, 2015)
- Tadjbakhsh, Shahrbanou (2009). "Interdependency Trends in a Multi-Polar World". International Issues & Slovak Foreign Policy Affairs. 18 (2): 3–20. ISSN 1337-5482. JSTOR 26591281.
- "Human Security Twenty Years On" in Norwegian Peace Building Resource Center Paper (2014)
- "In Defense of the Broad Approach of Human Security" in Handbook on Human Security (Routledge, 2013)
- "The Persian Gulf and Afghanistan: Iran and Saudi Arabia's Rivalry Projected" (PRIO, 2013)
- "Central Asia and Afghanistan: Insulation on the Silk Road, Between Eurasia and the Heart of Asia" (PRIO, 2012)
- Tadjbakhsh, Shahrbanou (1994). "Tajikistan: From freedom to war". Current History. 93 (582): 173–177. doi:10.1525/curh.1994.93.582.173. ISSN 0011-3530. JSTOR 45316979. S2CID 150835660.
- "After 9/11: A Wasteland of Buried Reason" (Open Democracy, 2011)
- "South Asia and Afghanistan: The Robust India-Pakistan Rivalry" (PRIO, 2011)
- "International Relations Theory and the Islamic World View" (2010)
- "Liberal Peace is Dead? Not So Fast" (2009)
- "Peacemaking in Tajikistan and Afghanistan: Lessons Learned and Unlearned" (2008)
- "Normative and Ethical Frameworks for Human Security in Eastern and Central Europe: A Status Report" with Odette Tomasco-Hatto (UNESCO, 2007)
- "Human Security: Concept, Implications and Application for Post-Intervention Afghanistan" (CERI, 2005)
- "Between Socialism and Islam: Women in Tajikistan" (1996)
- "National Reconciliation in Tajikistan: the Imperfect Whim" (1995)
- "Tajikistan: A Forgotten Civil War" with Nassim Jawad (1995)
- "The Bloody Path of Change: The Case of Post-Soviet Tajikistan" (1993)
- "The Tajik Spring of 1992: A Comparison of Tajik Political Parties" (1993)
- "Causes and Consequences of the Civil War"
- Tadjbakhsh, Shahrbanou (2009). "Conflicted Outcomes and Values: (Neo)Liberal Peace in Central Asia and Afghanistan". International Peacekeeping. 16 (5): 635–651. doi:10.1080/13533310903303271. S2CID 153795656.

== External sources ==
- "Shahrbanou Tadjbakhsh". Sciences Po. 2016-10-18.
- "Shahrbanou Tadjbakhsh". Academia.edu.
- Shahrbanou Tadjbakhsh - Lennart Meri Conference, ICDS
- "Shahrbanou Tadjbakhsh". Georgetown University.
- Shahrbanou Tadjbakhsh: Bibliography
- "Shahrbanou Tadjbakhsh". International Panel on Exiting Violence.
- "Shahrbanou Tadjbakhsh". Peace Research Institute Oslo (PRIO). 2016.
- "Shahrbanou Tadjbakhsh". Norwegian Centre for Conflict Resolution. 2016.
- Stockholm International Peace Research Institute (SIPRI)
- Open Democracy
- C-SPAN

== See also ==
- Peace Research Institute Oslo
- Sciences Po
- United Nations
- Peacebuilding
- Human security
- Central Asia
- Afghanistan
- Tajikistan
- Edward A. Allworth
- Ryszard Kapuściński
