= Badr al-Din Hilali =

Persian poet

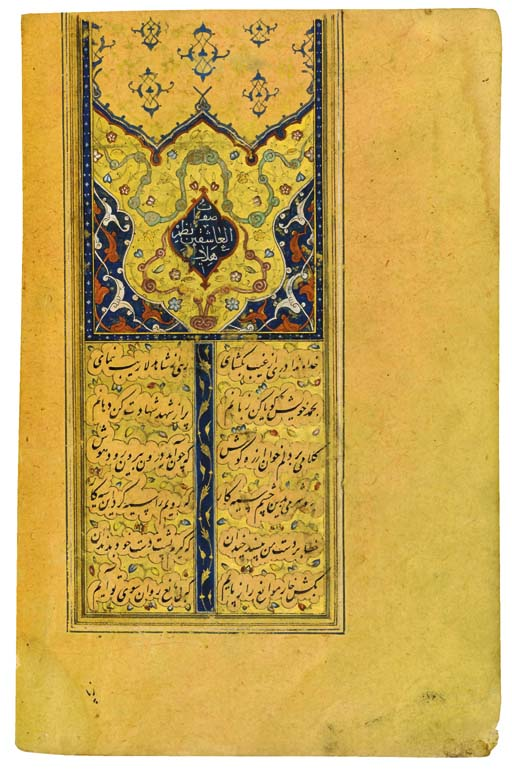
- Persian manuscript of Badr al-Din Hilali's poem Sifat al-'Ashiqin ("Qualities of lovers"). Copied by Shah Muhammad, Safavid Iran, dated early 16th century
- Born: c. 1470; Astarabad
- Died: 1529; Herat
- Occupation: Poet

Badr al-Din Hilali (Persian: بدرالدین هلالی; c. 1470–1529) was a Persian poet of Turkic origin. In Herat, he was a member of the literary circle of Sultan Husayn-e Bayqara and a close associate Alisher Navai.

== Works ==
- Hilali's Divan (including his ghazals, qasidas and ruba'is)
- Leyla-o-Majnun
