= Edward A. Allworth =

American historian (1920–2016)

- Born: December 1, 1920
- Died: October 20, 2016 (aged 95); New York City, U.S.
- Awards: CESS Lifetime Service to the Field Award (2016, awarded posthumously)

Academic background
- Education: Oregon State University; University of Chicago; Columbia University (PhD)

Academic work
- Main interests: Soviet Central Asia
- Notable works: Central Asia: A Century of Russian Rule (1967)

Edward A. Allworth (December 1, 1920 – October 20, 2016) was an American historian specializing in Central Asia. Allworth was widely regarded as the West's leading scholar on Central Asian studies. He extensively studied the various ethnic groups of the region, including Uzbeks, Tajiks, and Bukharan Jews. He wrote numerous books on the history of Central Asia.

Edward was the grandson of Alfred and Fanny Wickson Allworth, about whom he wrote a book, From Mansion to Cottage, the Life of Alfred and Fanny.

== Background ==
Edward A. Allworth was born on December 1, 1920, the son of Edward Allworth (1895–1966) and Ethel Walker. (His father received the Medal of Honor for service in France during World War I.) He received his bachelor's degree from Oregon State University, and received a master's degree from the University of Chicago. In 1959, he received a Ph.D. from Columbia University.

== Career ==
During World War II, Allworth served as a platoon leader, second lieutenant, and adjutant, in the 501st Parachute Infantry Regiment, 101st Airborne Division of the US Army, in the Normandy Invasion and the division's battles thereafter through the Allied World War II victory in Northern Europe.

Allworth taught a wide variety of courses on Central Asian studies at Columbia University. In 1984, he established the Department of Middle East Languages and Cultures to focus on the study of contemporary Central Asia. He published numerous books on the history of Central Asia. These include Uzbek Literary Politics (1964), Central Asian Publishing and the Rise of Nationalism (1965), Central Asia: A Century of Russian Rule (1967), The Nationality Question in Soviet Central Asia (1973), Nationality Group Survival in Multiethnic States (1977), The Modern Uzbeks: From the Fourteenth Century to the Present (1990), The Tatars of Crimea: Return to the Homeland (1998), and The Preoccupations of Abdalrauf Fitrat, Bukharan Nonconformist: An Analysis and List of His Writings (2000).

Allworth was Emeritus Professor of Turko-Soviet Studies at Columbia University. He was founding director at Columbia of both the Program on Soviet Nationality Problems (1970) and the Center for the Study of Central Asia (1984). Allworth was also editor of the Central Asia book series at Duke University Press.

== Personal life and death ==
Allworth extensively studied the Chagatai language. He was fluent in Uzbek and Uighur.

Allworth died on October 20, 2016, in New York City. In November 2016, the Central Eurasia Studies Society posthumously awarded Allworth with the CESS Lifetime Service to the Field Award.

== Legacy ==
Doctoral student Shahrbanou Tadjbakhsh remembered:

Professor Allworth always defended cultural history during the Cold War when the tendency was to study strategy and weapons, as well as during the post-Soviet period when the focus was on democracy building and economic transition models. When the Central Asian countries gained independence in the early 1990s, while some students dropped out of the Ph.D. track to follow the appeal of rapid lucrative employment in oil companies, governments and radio stations beaming propaganda to the region, he kept a handful of us at bay and steeped us in the writings of the early 20th century reformist writer Abdalrauf Fitrat [sic], and the study of Chagatay, the 15th century pre-Uzbek language.

Allworth donated his extensive collection of books on the languages of the region to the New York Public Library.

== Works ==
- Uzbek Literary Politics (1964)
- Central Asian Publishing and the Rise of Nationalism (1965)
- Central Asia: A Century of Russian Rule (1967)
- The Nationality Question in Soviet Central Asia (1973)
- Nationality Group Survival in Multiethnic States (1977)
- The Modern Uzbeks: From the Fourteenth Century to the Present (1990)

== See also ==
- Edward A. Allworth bibliography
- Edward Allworth
- Shahrbanou Tadjbakhsh
