= Majid Momhed-Heravi =

Iranian chemist

- مجید ممهد هروی
- Born: 1952 (age 73–74); Mashhad
- Scientific career
- Fields: Chemistry
- Institutions: Alzahra University

Majid Momhed-Heravi (born 1952) is an Iranian chemist and Distinguished Professor of Chemistry at Alzahra University.

== Life ==
Majid M. Heravi was born in 1952 in Mashhad, Iran. He received his B.Sc. degree from the National University of Iran in 1975 and his M.Sc. and Ph.D. degrees from the Salford University in 1977 and 1980. He completed his doctoral thesis under the supervision of Jim Clarck. He started his career as a research fellow in Daroupakhsh (a pharmaceutical company) in 1981 Tehran, joined as an assistant professor at Ferdowsi University of Mashhad in 1983, and was promoted to associate professor in 1993, and became a full professor in 1997. In 1999, he moved to Alzahra University as a professor of chemistry, where he is still working. He has previously been a visiting professor at UC Riverside and Hamburg University. His research interests focus on Heterocyclic Chemistry, Catalysis, Organic Methodology and Green Synthetic Organic Chemistry.
