= Abd al-Rafe Heravi =

12th-century Persian poet

Abd al-Rafi Heravi was a 12th-century Persian poet, who served at the court of the Ghaznavid ruler Khusrau Malik (r. 1160 – 1186) in his capital, Lahore. In 1186, however, the Ghaznavid kingdom was conquered in an invasion by the Ghurid ruler Mu'izz al-Din Muhammad, who had Khusrau Malik imprisoned. Heravi then began serving the Ghurids, where he was valued due to his skill. A large portion of his work has been lost; he is mostly known due to being mentioned several times in the works of the Persian writer 'Awfi.

== Sources ==
- Sajjadi, Zia-al-Din (1982). "ʿABD-AL-RĀFEʿ HERAVĪ". Encyclopaedia Iranica, Vol. I, Fasc. 2. p. 140.
