= Mahmud Muzahhib =

Persian illustrator and illuminator

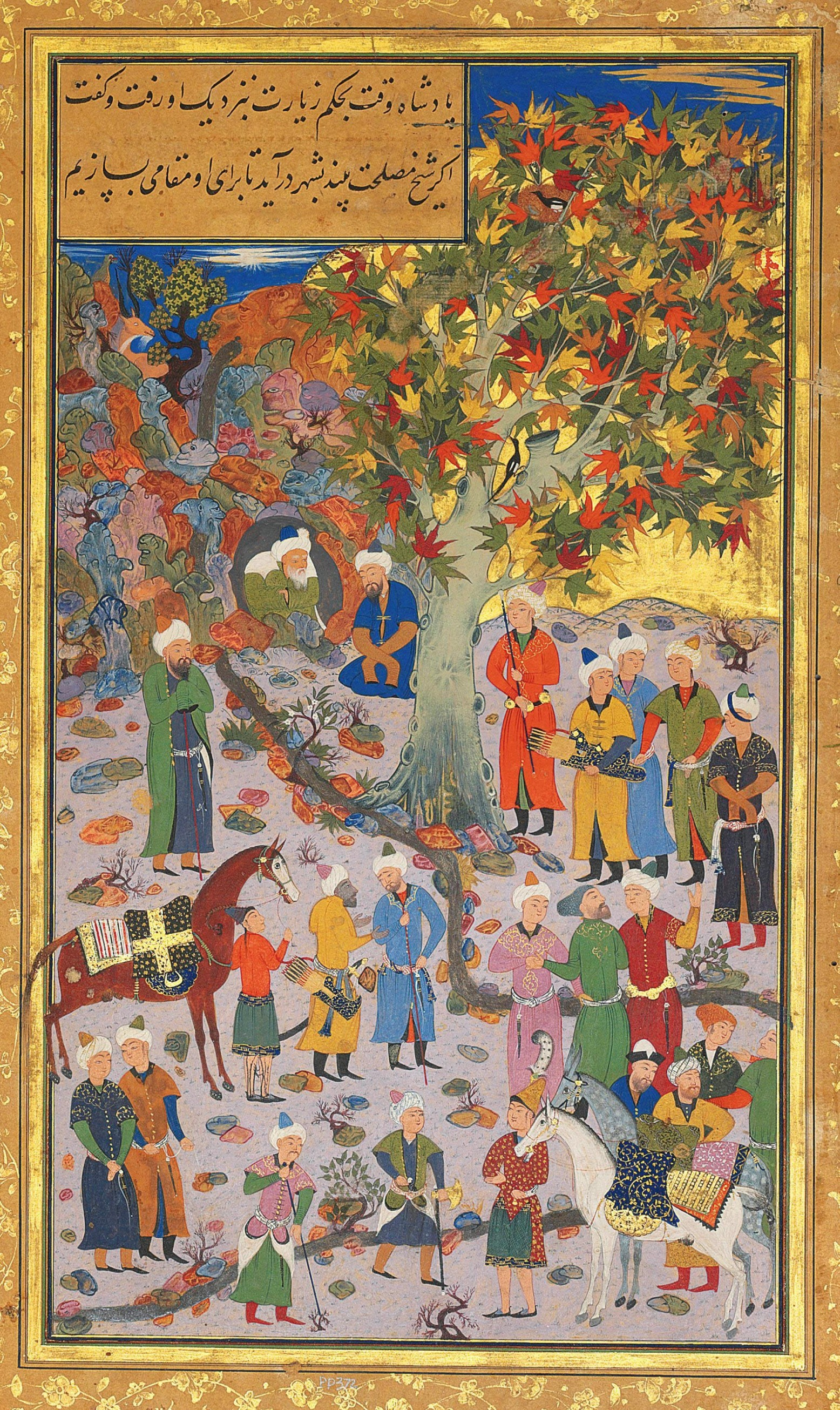
"Visit to a dervish", copy from a Gulistan of Saadi Shirazi, signed Mahmud Muzahhib. Created in Bukhara, dated 1560-61. The figure on the extreme right, wearing a band over his left eye, may have been the patron of the manuscript

Mahmud Muzahhib (fl. 1500-1560) was a Persian painter who played a key-role in transferring the artstyle of the Timurids of Herat to the Uzbek court at Bukhara.

== Sources ==
- Beach, Milo Cleveland (2003). "Mahmud Muzahhib". Oxford Reference.
