= Tarikh-i Dost Sultan =

Book by Ötemish Hajji

Tarikh-i Dost Sultan (named for Dost Sultan, son of Bujugha khan, who briefly ruled the Khanate of Khiva in 1557-1558, apparently the patron of the work) is a work of Ötemish Hajji bin Mawlana Muhammad Dosti, an historian of Khwarezm. It is a narrative account of the history of the Ulus of Jochi, including the conversion of Uzbeg Khan, leader of the Golden Horde, to Islam in the early 14th century. The "Tarikh-i Dost Sultan" also served as the foundation for the early historical sections of 'Abdulgaffar Qirimi's Umdet üt-tevärih, a history of the Crimean Tatar people written in 1744.

The work survives only in a single complete manuscript, formerly owned by Turkologist and Bashkir nationalist Zeki Velidi Togan (d. 1970). It has not been edited, and scholarly discussion is limited to Togan's own publications, and publications such scholars as have consulted the manuscript in Togan's library.

== Sources ==
- Vásáry, István (2009). "The Beginnings of Coinage in the Blue Horde". Acta Orientalia Academiae Scientiarum Hungaricae. 62, No. 4 (December). Akadémiai Kiadó: 371–385.
- Uli Schamiloglu, The Umdet ul-ahbar and the Turkic Narrative Sources for the Golden Hordeand the Later Golden Horde in H. B. Paksoy (ed.), Central Asian Monuments, 1992, ISBN 975-428-033-9.
- Z. V. Togan, Turkistan Tarihi, Istanbul, 1947.
