= Mehri Heravi =

Mehri Heravi (Persian: مهری هروی) was a 15th century poet who lived in Herat under the Timurid Empire.

== Life ==
Her original name was Mehr al-Nisa, while "Mehri" was her pen name, a name that is attested by several Persian writers. She may have been of Jalair origin or from Tabriz. She is often called "Heravi" since she lived much of her life in Herat, which some consider to have been her birth place. Later biographical texts considered her to have lived in 17th century Mughal India as a companion of the queen consort Nur Jahan, but earlier texts disprove this.

Mehri Heravi was a friend and companion of Gawhar Shad, the wife of the Timurid ruler Shah Rukh (r. 1405–1447). Mehri had been forced to marry Khvajah Hakim Abd al-Aziz, a physician of Shah Rukh and Gawharshad. He was affluent, but old and frail, which Mihri talked about in many of her poems. Mehri's lifestyle, which was considered unusual in her time, ultimately led to her imprisonment.

== Work, legacy and assessment ==
Mehri is considered a talented poet whose voice expresses women's concerns, although only a small portion of her poetry has survived. She appears in many important tazkirahs (biographical anthologies), which makes her an important figure in Persian literature. Although only the first verse of this collection has survived, it is said that she wrote a divan (collection of poetry) based on the ghazals of the 14th century Persian poet Hafez. Her poetry showed early signs of the later Indian Style. She openly opposed forced marriages to older men and condemned the mistreatment that some wives received from their husbands in at least five quatrains. According to the Iranian historian Yasaman Arang, Mehri could be regarded as "the third poet to candidly reveal feminine emotions in Persian verse" after the 10th century poet Rabia Balkhi and 12th century poet Mahsati.

Forced marriage again came under criticism in the poetry of the early 20th century Persian poet Zhaleh Alamtaj.

== Sources ==
- Arang, Yasaman (2025). "Mihrī Hiravī; An Audacious Poet in the Age of Discretion". Encyclopaedia Iranica.
