= Jahangirnama (Qasim Madih Harawi) =

The Jahangirnama (Note: Also spelled Jahangirnameh, from modern Iranian Persian pronunciation.) (Classical Persian: جهانگیرنامه Jahāngīrnāma, lit. 'Story of Jahangir') is an epic poem of nearly 3,600 couplets in the Persian language which relates the story of Jahangir son of Rostam. It was composed in Herat in the same meter as the Shahnameh. The author identifies himself in the final verses as “Qasim the panegyrist” (Classical Persian: قاسم مادح Qāsim-i Mādiḥ) (Note: Or Qāsem-e Mādeḥ in modern Iranian Persian.) who “versified this book in Herat”, and called for this reason Qasim Madih Harawi (Classical Persian: قاسم مادح هروی Qāsim-i Mādiḥ-i Harawī lit. 'Qasim the panegyrist of Herat'). It was published in Mumbai in 1309/1886.

Unlike other poems in Persian, the Jahangirnama contains a relatively high number of Arabic loanwords, and the stories also were under Islamic influence. According to Zabihullah Safa, this indicates that the poem is composed in the late 6th century AH or early 7th century AH. The poem seems to be largely an imitation of the Borzu Nama. In both stories, Rostam's son is brought up in Turan by Turanians and unknowingly fights against his Iranian compatriots. But at the end, he is recognized by the Iranians and then joins the Iranian army. Later, he is killed by a demon when hunting.

== Literary and scholarly reception ==
Modern scholarship situates the Jahangirnama within the post-Shahnameh epic tradition of eastern Iran, noting both its imitation of earlier heroic cycles and its comparatively heavier use of Arabic vocabulary and Islamic motifs. Recent studies describe the poem’s narrative confrontations and character dynamics as continuations of the Persian epic idiom after Ferdowsi, while reflecting the literary milieu of Herat and the later Persianate courts. A Persian text of the work attributed to Qasim Madih Harawi is available in open-access form and has been used by researchers to corroborate plot details and dictional features. For broader contextualization of late and post-classical Persian epics that mention or classify the Jahangirnama, see also surveys of the Iranian epic tradition.

== Sources ==
- Storey, C. A.; de Blois, François (1994). Persian Literature. Vol. 5, part 2.
- de Blois, François (1998). "EPICS". Encyclopædia Iranica.
