= Asafi Harawi =

Asafi Harawi (1449 – 1517), was a Persian poet active during the late Timurid era. Born in Herat, Asafi belonged to a family of bureaucrats. His father had served as the vizier of the Timurid ruler Abu Sa'id Mirza (r. 1451–1469), while his grandfather, Ala al-Din Ali, had served as a government official under Timur (r. 1370–1405).

== Sources ==
- Losensky, Paul E. (2009). "Āṣafī Harawī". In Fleet, Kate; Krämer, Gudrun; Matringe, Denis; Nawas, John; Rowson, Everett (eds.). Encyclopaedia of Islam (3rd ed.). Brill Online. ISSN 1873-9830.
- Raja'i, A. 'A. (1987). "Āṣafī Heravī". In Yarshater, Ehsan (ed.). Encyclopædia Iranica. Vol. II/7:ʿArūż–Aśoka IV. London and New York: Routledge & Kegan Paul. pp. 700–701. ISBN 978-0-71009-107-9.
