= Hamit Zübeyir Koşay =

Turkish archaeologist and ethnographer

Hamit Zübeyir Koşay (Bashkir: Абдулхәмит Зөбәйер Ҡушай; Tatar: Абдулхәмит Зөбәер Кушай; 1897–1984) was a Turkish archaeologist, ethnographer, writer, and folklore researcher.

== Biography ==
He was the son of Ubeydullah Efendi, who was a scholar of the period and Rizaetdin Fäxretdin (close friend of Musa Bigiev) a scientist, was his brother-in-law. He was sent to Turkey with the support of Rizaetdin Fäxretdin for his education in 1909.

He graduated from Thessalonica Central Secondary School in 1911. At the break of the Balkan War, he returned to Istanbul when he was in Sultaniye. He finished teacher training school in 1916 and became a teacher. After attending courses on ethnography and the Hungarian language at university for the winter semester, he went to Hungary to continue his education where he completed pedagogy.

He was accepted to the Advanced Teachers Training School at Eötvöş Kollegium (Eötvös Loránd University) with the support of Prof. Ne'meth Gyula. Then he attended the same university's Faculty of Philosophy and received the title of Doctor of Language and Turcology. He went to Germany in 1924 to attend the courses of Prof. Bang Koup at Berlin University and did research at the State Library and museums.

In 1925 he returned to Turkey and worked at the Ministry of National Education. After working as the Inspector of Libraries at the Ministry of Culture he was a director for the Department of Culture, Antique Works and Libraries at the same ministry. He continued as the general director of Antique Works and Museums, board member of Culture Training and for the second time as the director of the Ethnography Museum. He retired on 1 December 1969 after working for two years as deputy director of the Ethnography Museum and consulting general director of Antique Works and Museums.

He died on October 2, 1984, from a heart attack. He is buried at Cebeci Asri Cemetery (Ankara).

== Membership in committees and communities ==
- correspondent member of the Hungarian Kőrösi Csoma Science Association,
- member of the German Archaeology Institute (1932),
- correspondent member of the Czech-Prague Eastern Institute (1933),
- correspondent member of the Royal Swedish Academy of Sciences "Witterhats" History and Antique Works (1939),
- correspondent member of the Finnish Association of Archeology (1939),
- the permanent honorable member of the International Union for Prehistoric and Protohistoric Sciences (IUPPS). (1964, Rome),
- founding member of the Turkish Historical Society (April 23, 1930),
- founding committee member of the Turkish Language Association,
- member of the Turkish and Islamic Arts Institute (1955),
- science committee member of the Turkish Cultural Research Institute,
- honorary member of the Turkish Librarians Association,
- honorary member of the Turkey National Committee,
- Head of the International Council of Museums (ICOM) (1957–1965).

== Works ==
=== Excavation reports ===
- Kumtepe Kazısı (Kumtepe Excavation with I. Sprerling, 1934);
- Türk Tarih Kurumu Tarafından Yapılan Alacahöyük Hafriyatı, 1936'daki Çalışmalara ve Keşiflere Ait İlk Rapor (First Report about the Works and Discoveries in 1936 in the Alacahöyük Excavation, Carried out by the Turkish Historical Society, (in Turkish) 1936, (in English) 1938, (in German) 1944);
- Türk Tarih Kurumu Tarafından Yapılan Pazarlı Hafriyatı Raporu (Pazarlı Excavation Report carried out by the Turkish Historical Society);

=== Novels and Short Stories ===
- (in Turkish) Dokuz Ötkünç (Nine Stories, short story, 1929);
- (in Turkish) Cıncık (Keban Barajı Öyküsü) (Cincik - The Story of the Keban Dam, original Turkish version printed under the pen name of Şerafettin Işık, 1973);
- (in English) The History of a Potsherd From the Neolithic Age ... 'Cıncık' (The Story of the Keban Dam) (under his own name, translated by: Hayrettin Gürsoy, 1975);
- (in Turkish) Yuvak Taşı (Cylinder Stone, novel, 1947).

=== Study ===
- Susmuş Saz (Quieten Instrument, a study about Ardanuçlu Âşık Efkari, 1949).

== See also ==
- History of the administrative division of Russia in 1708-1744
- List of library associations
