= Musa Bigiev =

Jadidist thinker

Musa Bigeev
- موسى جار الله
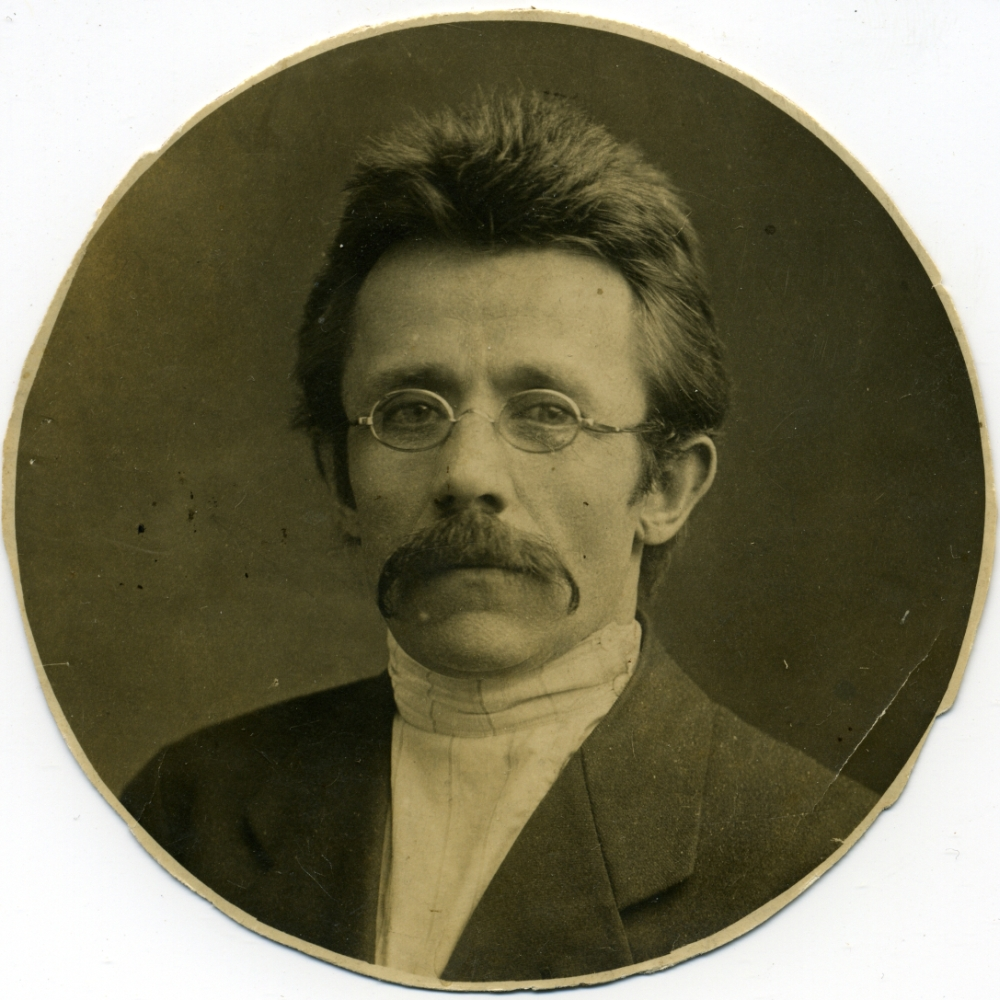
- Bigeev in the 1910s
- Born: 25 December 1873; Novocherkassk, Russian Empire
- Died: 28 October 1949 (aged 75); Cairo, Kingdom of Egypt
- Occupations: Philosopher; theologian; publicist
- Writing career
- Movement: Jadidism

Musa Jarullah Bigiev (Tatar: Муса Ярулла Бигиев; 25 December 1873 – 28 October 1949) was a Tatar Muslim scholar, theologian, philosopher, and publicist. He was one of the leaders of the Jadid movement, an Islamic modernist movement in the Russian Empire. As a controversial reformist thinker, Bigi received the nickname "Luther of Islam" from the scholar, Ottoman Shaykh al-Islam Mustafa Sabri.

After receiving his education in Kazan, Bukhara, Istanbul, and Cairo, he became a political activist for the Ittifaq, the political organisation of the Muslims of Russia. He also taught in Orenburg, wrote journalistic texts and translated classic works into Tatar. After emigrating from the Soviet Union, he travelled Europe and the Near and Far East while writing and publishing.

== Naming variations ==
In modern Tatar, Bigiev's name is written as Бигиев Муса Җарулла, Bigiev Musa Carulla, or Муса Ярулла улы Бигиев, Musa Jarulla ulı Bigiev. He had various names in Arabic; for example, Musa Jarullah ibn Fatima at-Turkistani al-Qazani at-Tatari ar-Rostofdoni ar-Rusi (موسى جار الله ابن فاطمة التركستاني القازانى التاتارى الروستوفدونى الروسى), ibn Fatima at-Turkistani ar-Rostofdoni ar-Rusi (موسى جار الله، ابن فاطمة، التركستاني الروستوفدوني الروسي), ibn Fatima ar-Rusi (ابن فاطمة الروسي), ibn Fatima at-Turkistani al-Qazani ar-Rusi (موسى بن جار الله التركستاني القازاني الروسي), at-Turkistani al-Qazani ar-Rusi (موسى بن جار الله التركستاني القازاني الروسي), or Musa Effendi Jarullah ar-Rusi (موسى أفندي جار الله الروسي).

There is no standardized English transliteration of Bigiev's name; versions include Bigi or Bigeev. His pen name his also variously given as Musa Jarullah, which is the name most contemporary Muslims knew him under, or as Musa Carullah, which is the name mostly used in modern Turkish literature.

== Life ==
=== Early life and education ===
Both the date and the place of Musa Bigievs birth are disputed. Opinions for the date include 1870, 1875 or 1873. The place is either the village of Mishar or the city of Novocherkassk. He was born into a middle-class family as the younger of two brothers. After his father was appointed as Akhoond, the family moved to Rostov-on-Don. After the father's early death in 1881, Bigiev's mother, Fatima Hanim Bigiyeva, provided for the education of him and his elder brother Muhammad Zahir Bigiev.

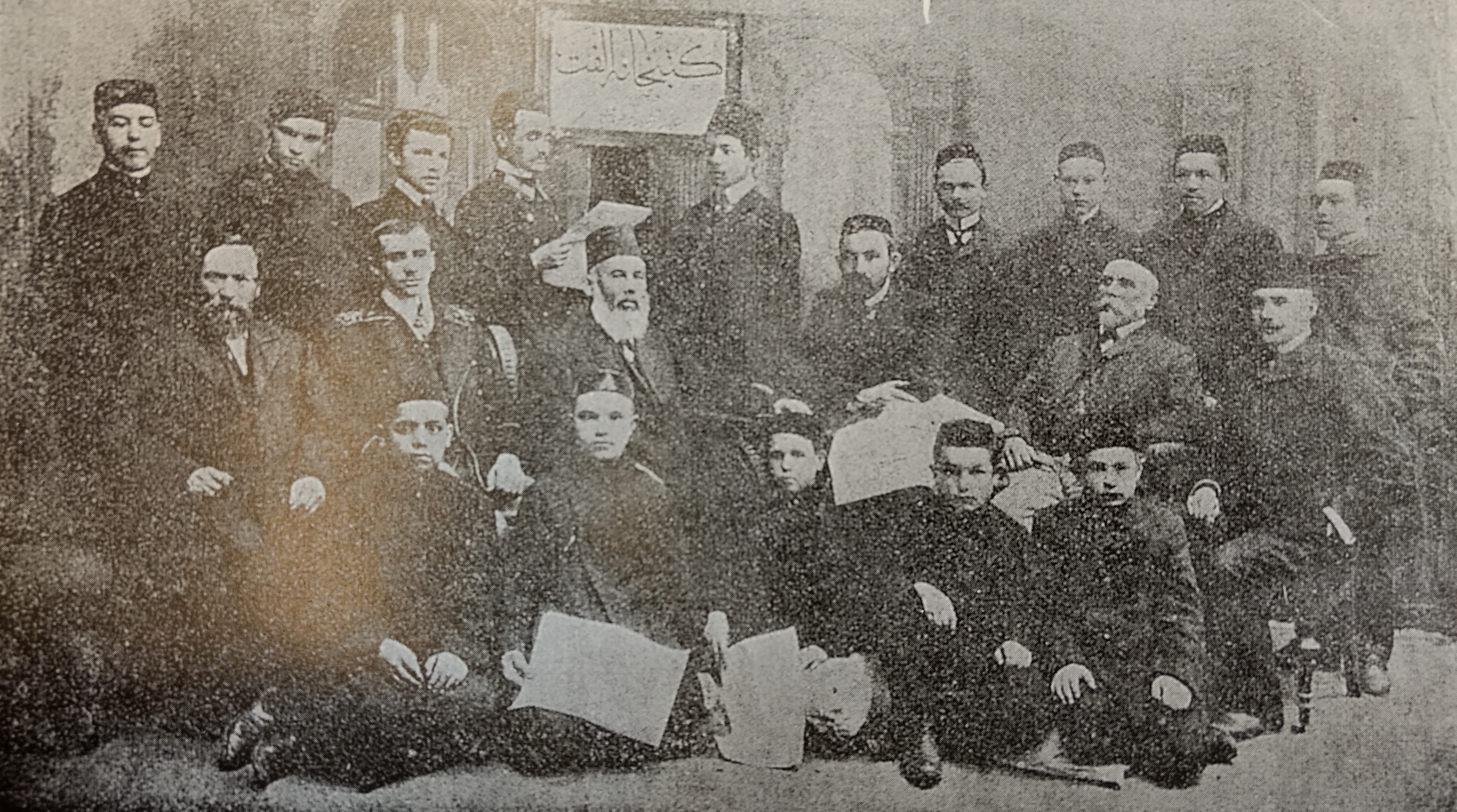
The editorial staff of Ülfät.

Bigiev spent most of his youth studying at madrasas in Kazan, Bukhara, Samarkand, Mecca, Medina, Cairo (where he attended the Dar al-Ifta al-Misriyyah and was educated by Shayk Muhammad Bakhit al-Muti'i), Damascus, Istanbul and Uttar Pradesh in India, where he studied Sanskrit and the Mahabharata. While he attended many famous universities, he preferred studying on his own while benefitting from the mentorship of different scholars.

In 1904, he returned to Russia, where he married Asma Aliye Khanim, daughter of a merchant and madrasah teacher from Chistopol. Afterwards, he moved to St. Petersburg and attended lectures at the Law faculty of St. Petersburg Imperial University as an auditor, in order to be able to compare Islamic and Western legal systems. He also became good friends with Abdurreshid Ibrahim, the editor of the newspaper Ülfät, in which he published several times.

=== Political activist ===
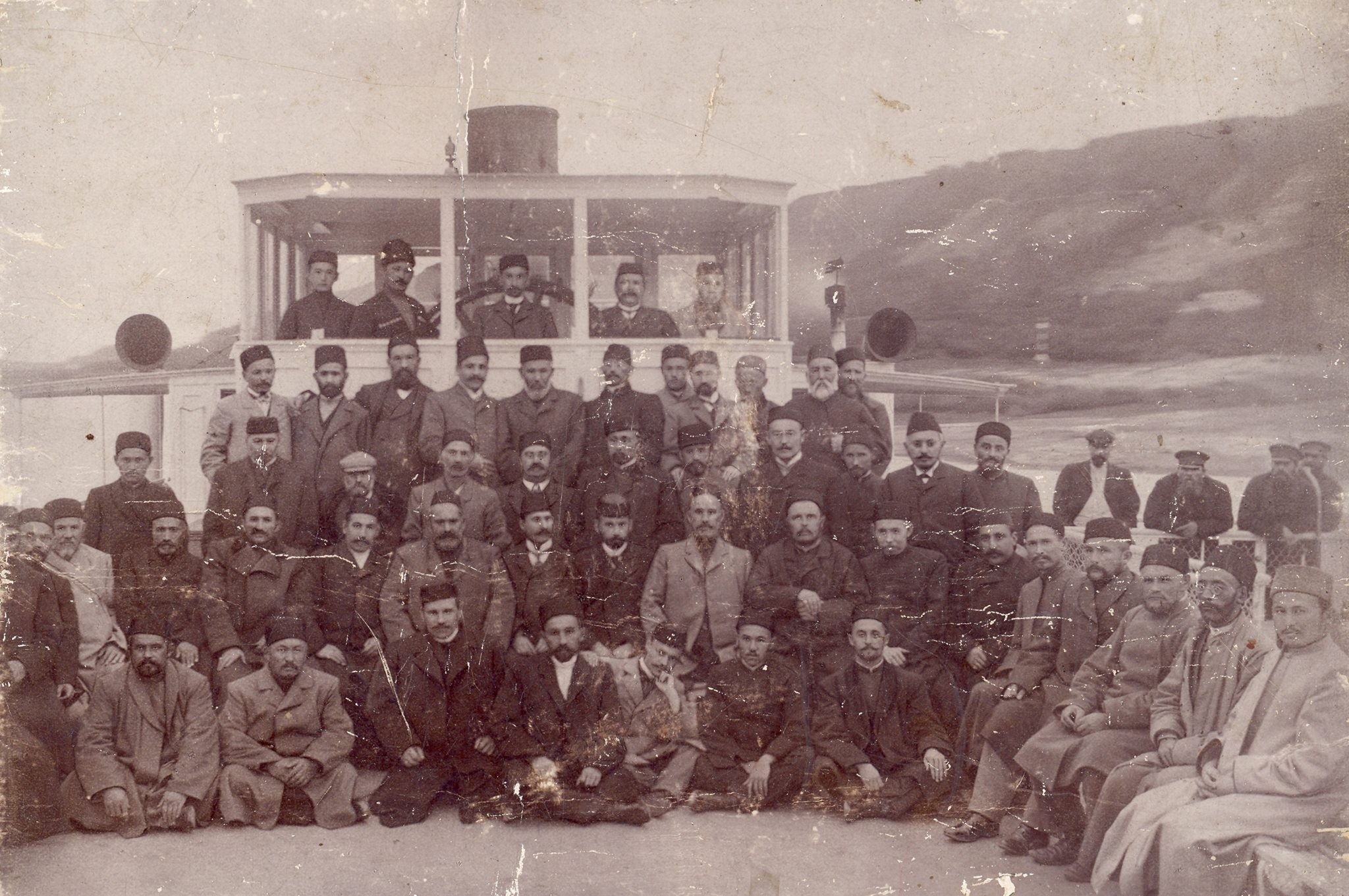
Participants of the first Congress of the Muslims of Russia.

During the Revolution of 1905, Bigiev became actively involved in the founding of the Muslim political organization, and later party, Ittifaq al-Muslimin, starting with the first Congress of the Muslims of Russia, which was held in Nizhny Novgorod in August. He also participated in the second and third congresses of 1905 and 1906, where he was elected as a member of the central committee of the parliamentary group in the Duma. Bigiev was responsible for providing the protocols of the Ittifaq meetings.

After the end of the Revolution, he also worked in publishing (in 1908 editing and publishing his deceased brother's book "A trip to Mesopotamia") and from 1910 onwards as a teacher at the Husayniya madrasah in Orenburg. He also held lectures at the city's philanthropic association (Orenburg Jäm'iyät-i Khayriyäsi) and became secretary of the fourth Muslim congress in 1914. In 1915, he published Islahat Asaslare ("The Fundamentals of Reform"), a catalogue of social and political change among the Muslims of Russia between 1904 and 1915.

After his publications in Rizaeddin bin Fakhreddins journal Shura drew immense criticism from the local Ulama, he left Orenburg.

=== Under the Soviets ===
Bigiev welcomed the February Revolution, claiming that "slavery is gone, and will never come back". Even after the takeover by the Soviets, he saw the new regime as a potential ally against what he perceived to be the primary enemy of the Muslims of the world – the British Empire. During the course of the Russian Civil War, Bigiev toured the Volga region together with Abdul Hafiz Mohamed Barakatullah in order to mobilize the Muslim population for military service against the British. He also held close contact with other anti-British Indian activists and arranged for them to live in the Soviet Union.

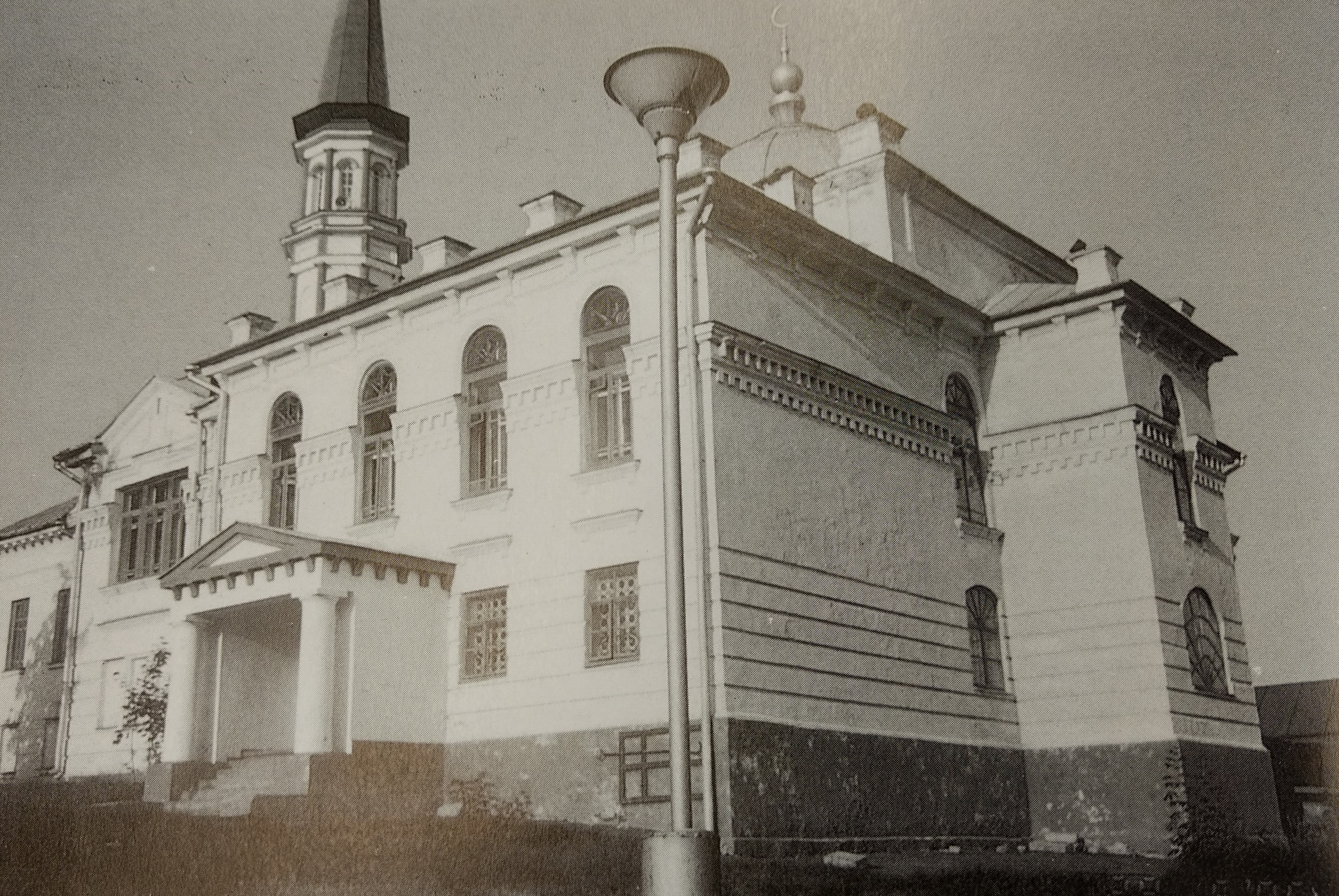
The Building of the Muslim Religious Administration in Ufa.

In 1920, Bigiev could be found in Ufa, where he presented a program for social reform with the title of "Appeal to the Islamic Nations" to the members of the Muslim religious administration; this included the allegiance of the Russian Muslims to the caliphate above the Soviet State. The program formed the basis for his book Islam Milletlerine ("To Muslim Nations"; or Islamning Elifbasi, "The Alphabet of Islam", as response to Nikolai Bukharins "Alphabet of Communism") of which 5,000 copies were printed in Berlin in 1923. Following this publication, he was arrested in Moscow while on his way from Petrograd to a conference in India. The Soviets had begun to suppress all forms of religious expression, including "Pan-Turkists" and "Pan-Islamists".

His arrest provoked a storm of indignation; for example, the Tatars of Finland requested the assistance of the Turkish government, which at that time was on friendly terms with the new Soviet regime. The leading newspapers of Istanbul and Ankara published telegrams with pleas to set Bigiev free again. The campaign finally succeeded; Bigiev was freed on the condition that he was to live in Moscow under state surveillance for two years.

Several years later, in May 1926, Bigiev was included in delegations of Soviet Muslims to the Pan-Islamic Congresses in Mecca and Cairo. On the return trip, he attended several sessions of the Turkish parliament and met the Turkish prime minister İsmet İnönü. After his return, he was also elected by the Leningrad Tatars to become their delegate at a congress of Muslim clergy in Ufa.

He returned to Leningrad again in 1927. The political climate had worsened harshly; Bigiev witnessed the League of Militant Atheists and was personally forbidden to leave the country. He was also out of work; he continuously applied to the scholar Ignaty Krachkovsky as a teacher of Arabic, Persian and Turkic languages at Leningrad University, and in 1929 even applied to the government of Afghanistan for a job. His wife and four of his children were temporarily arrested. In 1930, after he, his family and other clergymen where deprived of food coupons, he finally decided to secretly leave the country.

=== Exile ===
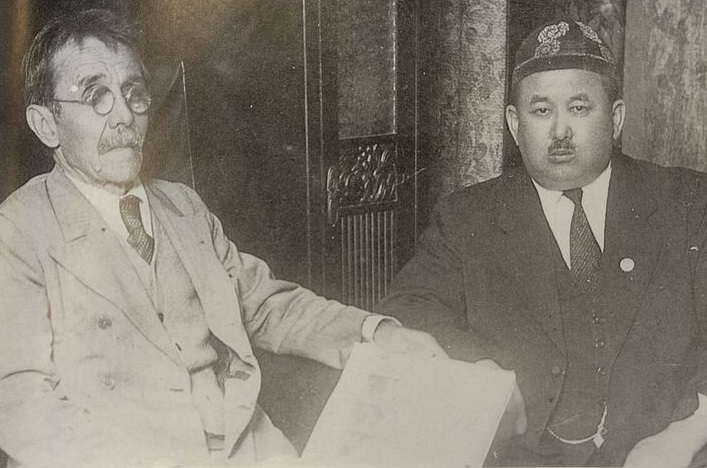
Musa Bigi with Bashkir leader Muhammed-Gabdulkhay Kurbangaliev.

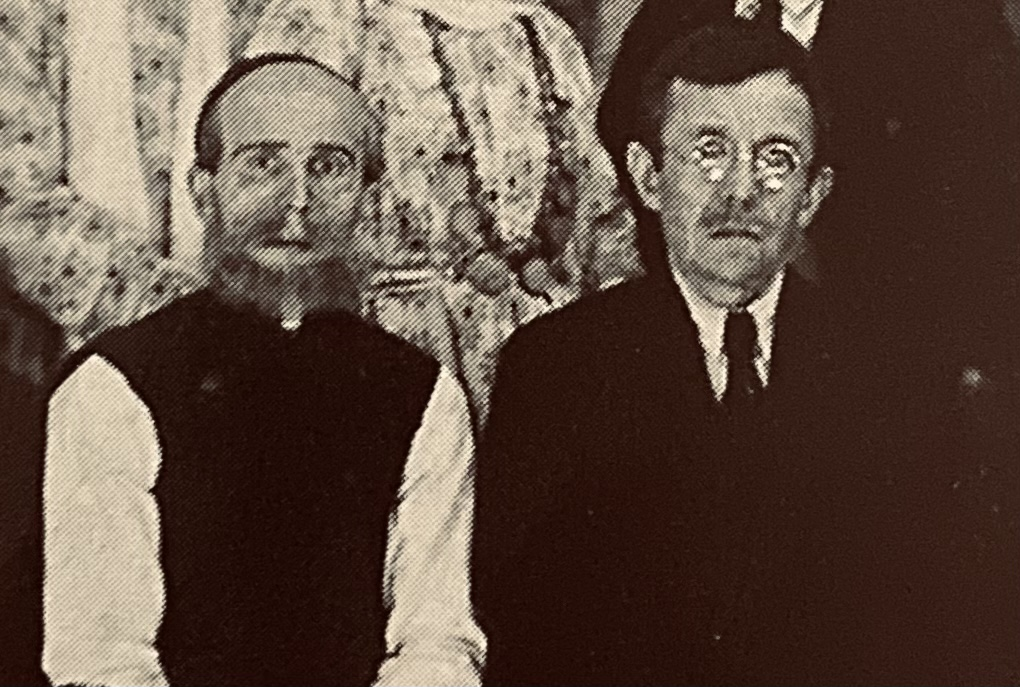
Musa Bigi (right), with Aisa Hakimcan, attending a Finnish Tatar play in Tampere in 1934.

He first crossed the border into Chinese Turkestan, where he tried to settle down in Kashgar; however, the Chinese government prohibited him from doing so. He then travelled on horseback to Afghanistan, where its ruler Nadir Shah provided him with an international passport. This allowed him to go to India, where he met some of his friends he had made in earlier years.

However, he did not stay in India for long, instead starting a period of worldwide travelling. In 1931, he held a speech at the World Islamic Congress in Jerusalem, where he praised Finland for its friendly attitude towards Muslim émigrés from Russia. He also visited Ankara, Berlin (where he founded an Islamic publishing house), Finland and Iran and Iraq, where he studied Shia Islam. He resumed his tour in 1937, again visiting India, more specifically Bombay and Benares. He was then invited by Abdurreshid Ibrahim to Japan; the two travelled together to China, Java, Sumatra and Singapore.

After the outbreak of World War II in 1939, Bigiev tried to reach Afghanistan again, but was arrested by British authorities in Peshawar without any charge. The ruler of Bhopal, Hamidullah Khan, petitioned for his release, but Bigiev was kept under house arrest until 1945. In these years, he wrote ten of his major works.

After his release, Bigiev suffered from illness which forced him to undergo several surgeries. In 1948, he travelled to Turkey and thence to Cairo, where he died on 28. October 1949. He was buried at the Royal Cemetery of the Khedives of Egypt.

== Legacy ==
While Bigiev left "a deep imprint on the history of the reformed madrasas and the Muslim press of Russia in the 1910s", his work and even his name are largely forgotten today. This can mostly be attributed to the Soviet Union under Stalin, where his name was purged from documents and bibliographies and the study of his works forbidden.

=== Rediscovery ===
He was officially rehabilitated by the High Court of the Russian Federation in February 1997. Still, only a small amount of research on his life and work has taken place and the amount of literature available in English is very limited.

However, a movement towards rediscovery seems to be taking place; one of Kazans streets is now named after Bigiev. In 2007, as a part of the project Ijma' – Concord, the Kunstkamera (Peter the Great Museum of Anthropology and Ethnography) of the Russian Academy of Sciences sponsored the documentary The manuscript and the Fate about Bigievs life, with a script written by the Orientalist Jefim A. Rezvan. A year later, in 2008, the documentary And the moon has split, directed by B. Baishev, was awarded a special prize "for the contribution to Islamic Enlightenment" at the fourth Golden Minbar International Film Festival.

Bigievs Quran translation was reprinted in 2010 from copies saved by descendants. For the 140th anniversary of his birth, a number of activities were held in the Penza Oblast of Russia; on June 23, a plaque was dedicated in the city of Kikino, one of Bigievs supposed birth places, and a maktab and a garden near the mosque of the town were renamed in Bigievs honor.

=== Family ===
Bigievs wife Asma died in Ufa in 1979; of their eight children, two died young.

His son-in-law Abdurahman Tagirovich Tagirdzhanov became a professor of Orientalism at Leningrad State University, while his cousin Abrashit Museevich Bigiev (1917–2010) became professor for Metallurgy at Magnitogorsk State Technical University.

Today, descendants of Bigiev live in Russia (in Ufa, Moscow and St. Petersburg) and in Ukraine (Dnepropetrovsk).

== Views ==
While he was one of the leading members of Jadidism, Bigievs provocative nature led to opposition not only from the Kadimists (nearly all issues of the Qadimist journal Din vä Ma'ishät include one or more articles written directly against him), but also from fellow reformers.

In his 97-page essay Rahmet-i Ilahiye Burhanlari ("The Storms of God's Clemency"), published in Orenburg in 1910, Bigiev argued that God would also include unbelievers in his mercy and forgiveness. This elicited criticism from many Ulama, including Ismail Gaspirali.

The influence of Bigiev was felt beyond the Russian Empire, for example in Istanbul, where the scholar, Shaykh al-Islam Mustafa Sabri Efendi criticized Bigiev for his "dangerous and heretical" (küfriyati muhtevi) ideas and was responsible for the ban of three of his works in the Ottoman Empire. In Yeni İslam Müçtehidlerinin Kıymet-i İlmiyesi (1919), Sabri said: "The material progress of European civilization surpassed that of the Islamic one, therefore putting the Muslim world in a weak and disadvantaged position while undermining the confidence of Muslim thinkers about their civilization and causing great damage to their beliefs and their value system. Although an eminent scholar, Musa Carullah Bigief was unfortunately unable to remain immune to this disease that afflicted Islamic intellectuals. The existing material advancement in European civilization impressed him so much that he forgot the might and power of God". Sabri coined the epithet "Luther of Islam" for Bigiev.

Bigiev has also been described as one of "the most notorious Sunnite polemicists against Shiism in the 20th century", along with such figures as Muhibb al-Din al-Khatib and Ihsan Ilahi Zahir. This is the result of him penning several well-known anti-Shia books, including Al-Washi'ah fi Naqd 'Aqa'id al-Shi'ah. In these works, Bigiev claims that during his travels in Iraq and Iran he had not met even one Shia individual who knew the Quran to a satisfactory level.

== Works (selection) ==
Bigiev wrote extensively; for example, he published 64 books and more than 120 essays and articles on theology. Included here are some of his most notable works.

- Translations of the Quran and Hafez' Diwan into Tatar
- Tarihu'l Qur'an ve'l-Masahif ("A history of the Quran and the Quranic texts") – Published after Bigiev discovered editorial changes by Mullahs in a Quran edition
- 1913: Rahmet-i Ilahiye Burhanlari ("The storms of God's clemency")
- 1913: Insannarning Aqidah Ilahiyatlarena Ber Nazar ("A Glimpse of the People's Belief in God")
- 1913: Ozin Konnarda Ruza. Itjihad Kitabi ("Fasting during Long Days. A Book of Itjihad")
- Sherhu'l Luzumiyat ("Commentaries on Al-Luzumiyat") – Critical commentary on the work of Al-Maʿarri
- Büyük mevzularda ufak fikirler ("Small thoughts on big issues") – Critique of the work of the Ulama Ziyauddin Kamali, shows Bigievs high opinion of mysticism and Sufism
- Qavaid-i Fiqhiyyä ("The principles of Islamic jurisprudence")
- 1915: Islahat Asaslare ("The Fundamentals of Reform")

== Literature ==
- Ahmet Kanlidere: Reform within Islam. The Tajdid and Jadid Movement among the Kazan Tatars (1809–1917), Istanbul 1997; p. 52-56.
- Ahmet Kanlidere: Rusya Türklinderinden Musa Carullah Bigi (1875–1949), Istanbul 1988.
- Azade-Ayşe Rorlich: The Volga Tatars, Stanford 1986; p. 59-61.
- Charles Kurzman: Modernist Islam, 1840–1940. A Sourcebook, New York 2002, p. 254.
- Elmira Akhmetova: Musa Jerullah Bigiev (1875–1949). Political Thought of a Tatar Muslim Scholar, Intellectual Discourse (2008, Vol.1), p. 49-71.
- Aydar Khairetdinov: The Last Tatar Theologian. The Life and Heritage of Musa Jarullah Bigiev, 1999.
- Dimitri Spikav and Nayla Tabbara: Christianity and Islam in the Context of Contemporary Culture. Perspectives of Interfaith Dialogue from Russia and the Middle East, St. Petersburg / Beirut 2009; p. 45-47.
