= Shura (magazine) =

Literary and political magazine published in Orenburg, Russian Empire (1908–1918)

- Cover page of issue 8 dated 1908
- Editor: Rizaeddin bin Fakhreddin
- Categories: Literary magazine; Political magazine
- Frequency: Biweekly
- Founder: Muhammad Shakir; Zakir Ramiyev
- Founded: 1908
- First issue: 10 January 1908
- Final issue: January 1918
- Country: Russian Empire
- Based in: Orenburg
- Language: Tatar; Turkish

Shura (Tatar: Council) was a biweekly literary and political newspaper supplement published in Orenburg, Russian Empire, between January 1908 and January 1918. The magazine featured articles written in both Turkish and Tatar languages. It was one of the most important Tatar language publications.

== History and profile ==
Shura was established by Muhammad Shakir and Zakir Ramiyev. It was inspired from the Arabic magazine Al Manār which was edited by Rashid Rida in Cairo. Shura was first published 10 January 1908. It was a supplement of the daily newspaper Waqt which was in circulation between 1906 and 1918, and both publications were based in Orenburg. Shura was published in Tatar language on a biweekly basis, on the first and fifteenth day of each month. The editor of Shura was a reformist religious official, Rizaeddin bin Fakhreddin. The editorial board of the magazine included Musa Jurullah Begiyev, Fatih Karimiy and Jamaliddin Validiy.

Although its readers were Muslims, Shura was deeply influenced from Russian culture. The magazine published translated versions of the articles from Al Manar and other magazines, including Al Liwa. Zakir Ramiyev's poems were published in Shura. The magazine also featured poems about the Turkestani graveyards between 1911 and 1913. The other common topics covered in the magazine were biographies of leading Muslim figures, history of the Turks and linguistics. Shura also featured articles on geography and ethics. The magazine published a very comprehensive obituary for Ismail Bey Gasprinski in four issues in 1914.

In 1917 Shura published the numbers 23 and 24 in combination. The magazine ceased publication in January 1918 when the communists occupied Orenburg and closed it.
