= Rizaeddin bin Fakhreddin =

Bashkir-Tatar scholar and publicist (1858–1936)

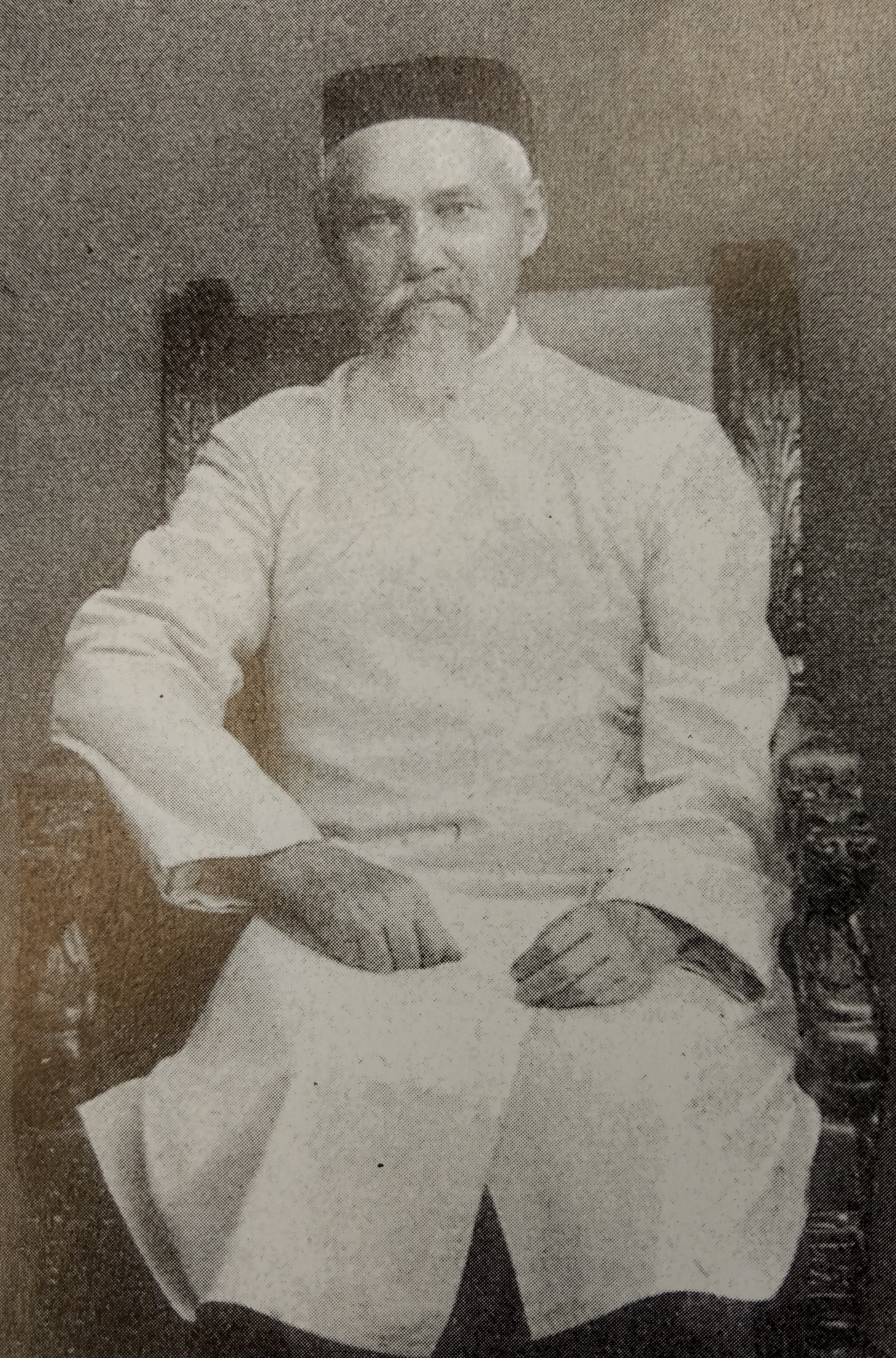
- Born: January 12, 1858; Kichuchat, Samara
- Died: 1936 (aged 77–78)
- Occupations: Scholar, publicist
- Writing career
- Literary movement: Jadidism

Rizaeddin bin Fakhreddin (Kiçüçat, Samara, 12 January 1858 – 1936) was a Bashkir and Tatar scholar and publicist who lived in the Russian Empire and the Soviet Union. His numerous works on religious, political and pedagogical subjects were a part of the Jadidist movement, and the journal Shura (magazine) (Tatar: شورا, lit. 'Council'), which he created and published, was an important way of political discussion for Muslims in the late Empire.

== Life ==
Rizaeddin bin Fakhreddin was born as son of a mullah in the village of Kiçüçat in the gouvernement Samara. He studied at the kuttab in his village, which his father led, and then at the madrasa in the near village of Chelsheli. At the age of 30, he became mullah and leader of the madrasa in the village of Ilbek. In 1891, he was elected qadi, meaning he became a member of the Russian religious administration for Muslims ((Russian: Собрание, romanized: Sobranye, lit. 'collective')); he therefore moved to its seat in Ufa, where he administrated the extensive archive of the agency.

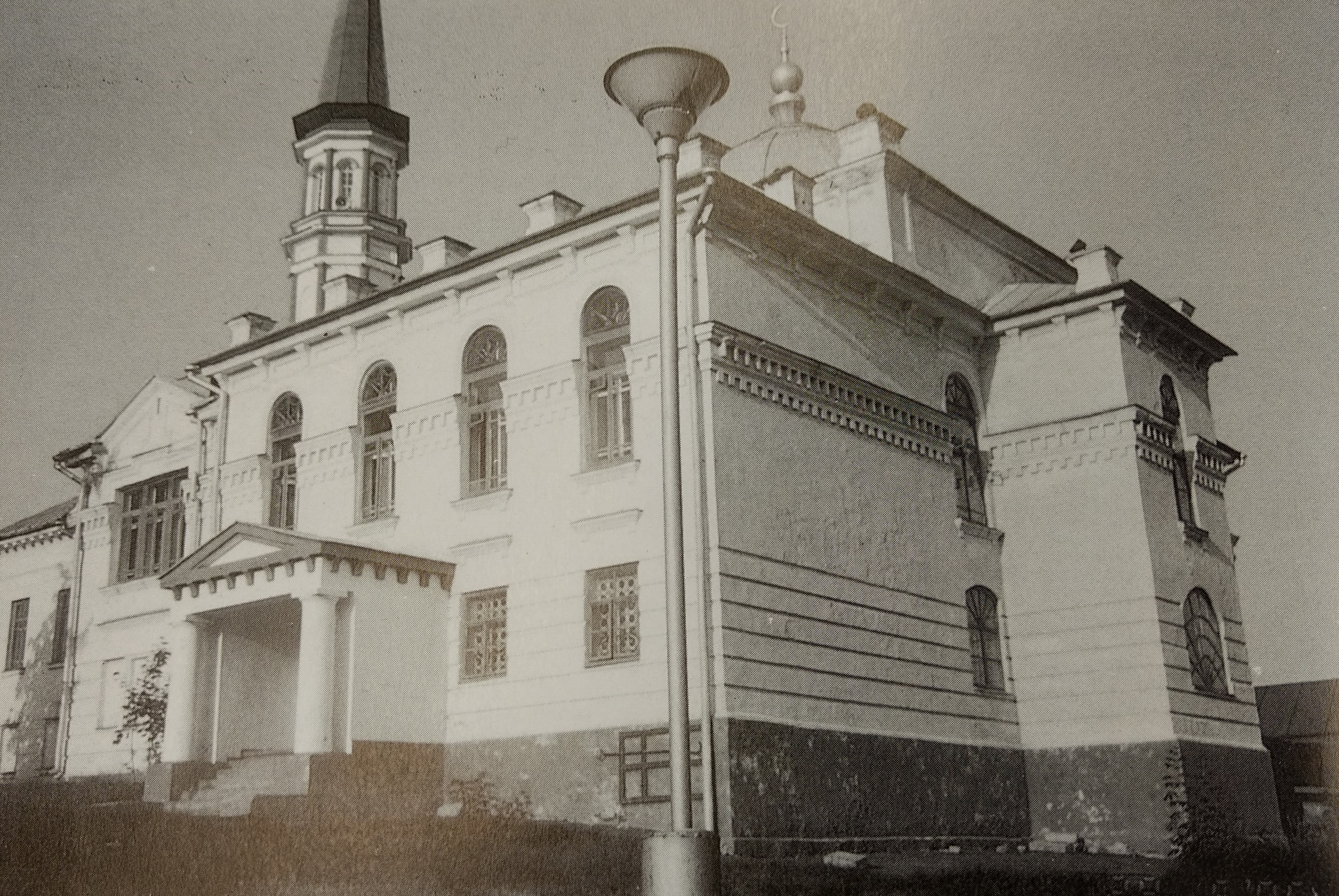
Building of the Muslim Religious Administration or Sobranye in Ufa

During the Russian Revolution of 1905, he submitted an extensive reform program to the muftis of the Sobranye. This program, among other things, included the extension of the responsibility of the agency over the Kazakh Muslims. The Russian government refused the program due to the expected gain in power this centralization would have brought for the Muslims.

In 1906, Fakhreddin retired from his religious office and became editor of the Orenburg newspaper Waqt. During this period, he also became a close friend of Musa Bigiev. Two years later, he started publishing Shura, which became the longest-lived of Tatar publication in the Russian Empire. In 1921, after the Russian Revolution, he again took on a religious office and was mufti of European Russia until he died in 1936. He avoided cooperating with the Soviets as much as possible.

== Work ==
As it was a part of Jadidism, Fakhreddin's work was influenced by many other Jadids. For example, he studied at Märcani Mosque for some time and later met the Iran-born political activist Jamal al-Din al-Afghani during a journey in Saint Petersburg. The Egyptian scholar Muhammad Abduh was another influence.

Fakhreddin spoke Arabic, Persian, Turkic and Russian. He used the neo-Turkic common language that had been proclaimed by Ismail Gasprinsky as a common language for all Turkic peoples but kept Tatar linguistic peculiarities.

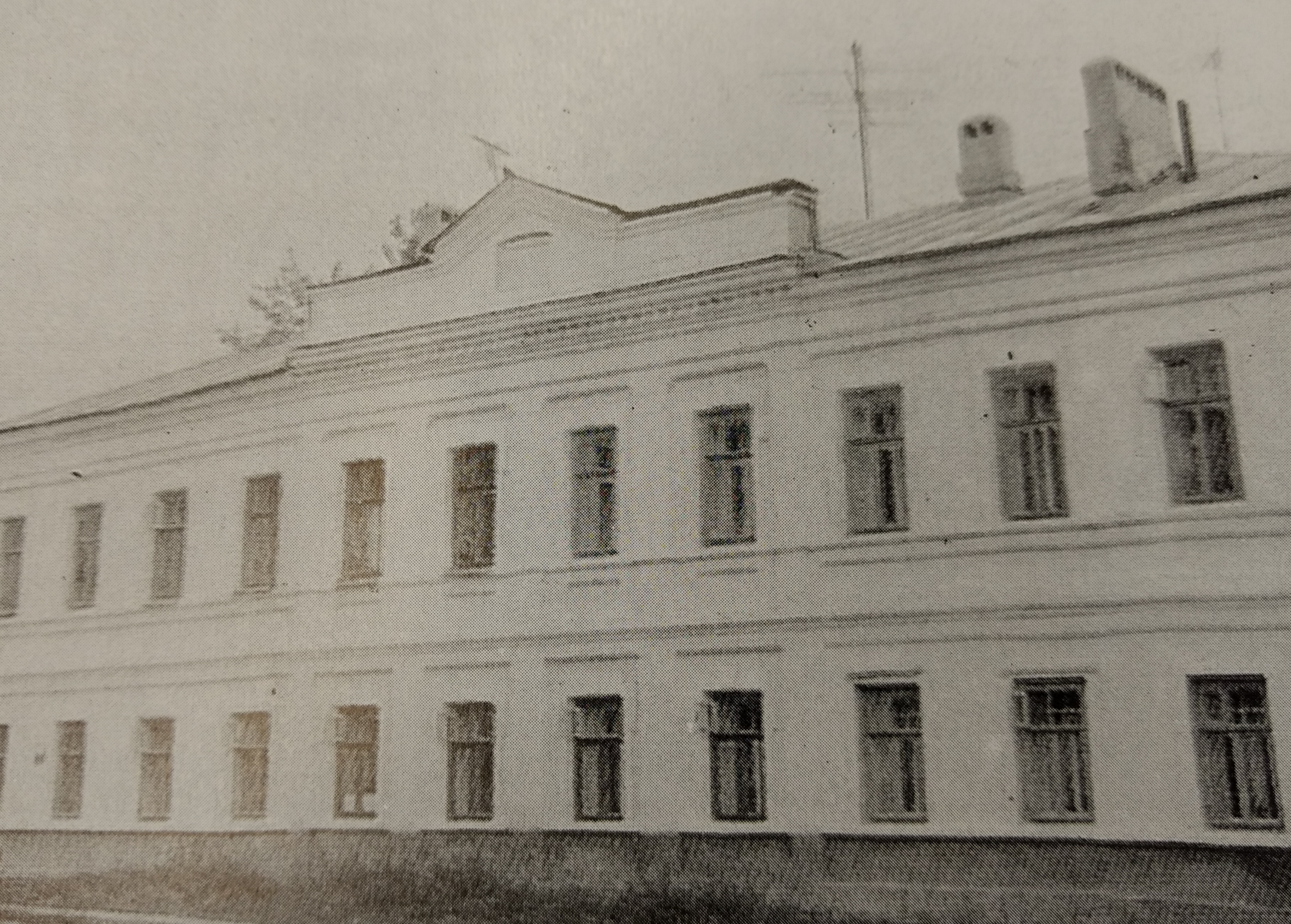
Märcani Mosque, Kazan

Fakhreddin was an extremely productive author, who wrote more than sixty books during his life. His most important work is a two-volume edition of biographies of Central Asian Scholars (Asar and Meshhur Irler), which he wrote while he was at the archive of the Muslim religious administration. On some of the depicted individuals (which include Ibn Rushd (Averroes), ibn Arabi, al-Ghazali and ibn Taymiyya) his work remains the best source. He also published journalistic texts, books and essays on the general situation of Muslims in Russia, pedagogical works or on social debates (for example on women's education and family politics). His essay, Rusya Muslimanlarining ihtiyachlari ve anlar haqinda intiqad, published in 1906, is a critique against the reform demands of the ulama against the Russian rulers, which Fakhreddin regarded as too vague.

According to Azade-Ayşe Rorlich, the importance of education for the overcoming of poverty and the possibility of a reconciliation of Islam and science were central parts of Fakhreddin's world view. He saw the rise and fall of nations as directly connected to their belief systems and therefore believed that a renunciation of superstition and a return to the beginnings of Islam would be necessary for a Muslim renaissance. He also criticized the historical work of ibn Khallikan due to his concentration on the doings of rulers and tried to honor the deeds of "normal" Muslims in his books and writings.

== Works (selection) ==
He has been described as a "prolific writer who published more than sixty books and left many unpublished manuscripts in a wide range of disciplines including history, politics, law, and education."

- Asar
- Meshhur Irler ("Famous People")
- Meshhur Khatunlar ("Famous women")
- Munasib Diniye ("On Religion")
- Islamlar haqinda kükümet tedbirleri ("The actions of the government concerning Muslims")
- Rusya Muslimanlarining ihtiyachlari ve anlar haqinda intiqad ("The needs of the Russian Muslims and a critique of them")

== Literature ==
- Ahmet Kanlidere: Reform within Islam. The Tajdid and Jadid Movement among the Kazan Tatars (1809–1917), Istanbul 1997; p. 50-52.
- Azade-Ayşe Rorlich: The Volga Tatars, Stanford 1986; p. 53-58.
- Charles Kurzman: Modernist Islam, 1840–1940. A Sourcebook, New York 2002, p. 33.
- Ismail Türkoğlu: Rusya Türkleri Arasindaki Yenileşme Hareketinin Öncülerinden Rizaeddin Fahreddin (1858–1936) (Rizaeddin Fahreddin, A Pioneer of the Renewal Movement of the Turks of Russia), Istanbul 2000.
- Mahmud Tahir: Rizaeddin Fahreddin, in: Central Asian Survey (1989, Volume 8), S. 111–115.
- Ömer Hakan Özalp: Rizaeddin bin Fahreddin, Istanbul 2001.
