= Union of the Muslims of Russia =

Islamic political party in Russia

Union of the Muslims of Russia Иттифак әл-мөслимин
- Founded: 16 August 1906
- Dissolved: July 1917
- Headquarters: Saint Petersburg, Russia
- Ideology: Liberalism; Constitutional democracy Jadidism
- Religion: Islam

The Union of the Muslims of Russia (Ittifaq, short for Tatar: Иттифак әл-мөслимин, Ittifaq âl-Möslimin and Russian: Иттифа́к аль-Муслими́н, Ittifaq al-Muslimin) was a political organisation and party of Muslims in the late Russian Empire. The organisation was founded during the 1905 Revolution and came to an end after the February Revolution. Its political agenda was liberal-constitutional, closely aligned to that of the Kadet Party; the Islamic reform movement of Jadidism was an important influence. The Ittifaq was dominated by Volga Tatar intellectuals, but also included Muslim representatives of other ethnicities such as Azerbaijanis, Crimean Tatars, Caucasians and Central Asians.

== Background ==
=== Islam in Russia before 1905 ===
According to official statistics, the Russian Empire had 14 million Muslim subjects around 1900; Muslim Duma representatives even claimed a number as high as 30 million. The core of the Muslim population was located around Kazan, which had been conquered by Ivan the Terrible in the 16th century. Other areas with significant Muslim populations were the Crimea, Azerbaijan, Caucasus and Central Asia.

Periods of toleration and repression alternated. Under Ivan, noble Muslims were allowed to keep their titles and their Russian serfs, while the middle part of the 18th century saw the destruction of 418 of Kazan's 536 mosques. Catherine II followed the different strategy of promoting a new Muslim clerical structure, especially the Orenburg Muslim Spiritual Assembly, to strengthen Russian rule over Kazakhstan and other Muslim communities.

The conquest of Central Asia in the latter half of the 19th century had seen Muslim leaders call for Jihads against the Russian soldiers. Together with imperialist and social darwinist influences from Western Europe, this created a new picture of Central Asian Muslims as "fanatics" beyond rational discourse; this also reflected on Russian attitude towards "older" Muslim populations, for example in Kazan. Islam became an object of study in the new subject of Orientalism (Vostokovediene). Under Nikolay Ilminsky, the Russian administration started opening schools in Kazan in which the Tatar language was only taught in the first four years, while Russian was taught all through the curriculum. The desired effect was for "backwards" Muslim culture to "die out" over time without provoking a "fanatical" answer.

=== Jadidism ===
On April 22, 1883, the newspaper Terciman ("Interpreter") was published for the first time in the Crimean town of Bakhchysarai. Its publisher, Ismail Gaspirali, became the ideological forerunner of the Jadid movement. This movement was more than a response to the expansion of Russian rule into the cultural life of its Muslim subjects. It was a genuinely Muslim reform movement, the goal of which was a modernisation of all of society. The superiority of orthodox Russia was seen as a menace to an "authentic" Muslim way of life, but this menace was also seen as self-caused by backwardness and conservatism.

The main part of the Jadid reform program was the introduction of the phonetic "new method" (usul al-jadid) of teaching Arabic in Maktabs. Until then, the instruction had consisted out of memorizing Surahs from the Quran without translation. The Jadids also demanded the introduction of worldly topics of education. However, the Jadids were not secularizers, but religious reformers. Additionally, they promoted the cultural unification and "awakening" of Russian muslims through the adoption of a single language, Ottoman. The Jadids did not oppose Russian rule itself, but Russian attempts at forced assimilation as well as cultural and religious patronization. Especially the Orenburg Muslim Spiritual Assembly was seen in a critical light.

Moslems and Russians can plow, sow, raise cattle, trade and make their livings together, or side-by-side.

— Ismail Gaspirali

The Jadid medium of choice was the press. The founding of Terciman marked the beginning of an extremely lively Muslim newspaper milieu, especially after the Russian administration ended its opposition to Tatar language newspapers in 1905/06. In Central Asia, where printing had only been introduced after the Russian invasion, the Jadids founded Kutubkhana, combined bookstores and publishing houses. From 1905 to 1917, the total number of Tatar newspapers and magazines founded was 166, though most of them were short-lived. According to M. Pinegin, an Kazan official tasked with censorship, their ideological alignment was rather clear: "The ideals and aims of nearly all Muslim newspapers and journals are the same, and their orientation can only be described as Nationalist-Progressive".

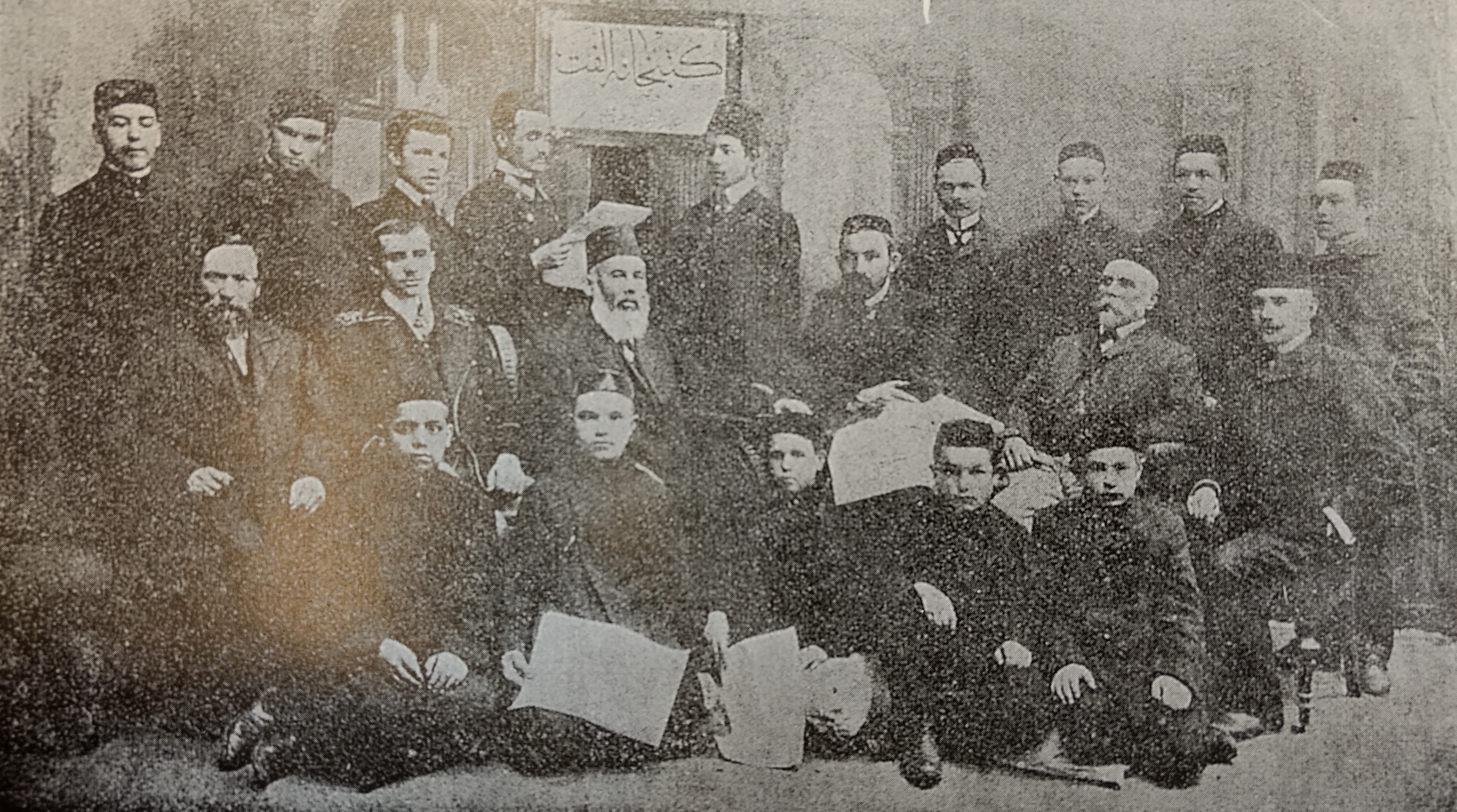
The publishers of Ülfät, a newspaper from Kazan

However, this did not mean the Jadids did not face Muslim opposition: Their reform program was not accepted by the majority of the Ulama. These Kadimists (Adherents of the "old method", usul i-qadim) were especially opposed to the theological reinterpretations of Jadidism and the attempts at rationalization of traditions and branded the Jadids heretics or youthful hotheads.

The Jadids were a very heterogenous movement. Among Volga Tatars, most reformers were young Ulama, who had often gone to Russian schools. Central Asian Jadids were influenced by Tatar ideas, but consisted out of a bourgeois middle class created by a cotton boom. Kazakh reformers even defined themselves through their resistance against Tatar patronization. Meanwhile, the most important factors in Azerbaijan were a cultural "de-Iranization" and hostility against non-Turkic ethnicities.

Still, Jadidism remained a project for the elites up until 1917, with the Kadimists traditionalism prevailing among the majority of the Muslim population. The reason for Jadid dominance can instead be found in the fact that the introduction of a rational, public discourse about necessary reforms of society was itself an integral part of their program, while the Kadimists accepted the new ways of communication only grudgingly. This should also have an effect during and after the 1905 Revolution, when the conflict between Jadids and Kadimists took a back seat to all-Russian Muslim organization.

== History ==
=== First congress ===
Between 1904 and 1907, old problems of the Russian Empire (rising politicisation, economic crisis and agrarian question) met with short-term causes, especially the St. Petersburg Bloody Sunday. Together, they resulted in the 1905 Russian Revolution. During the next years, a decay of autocratic power allowed opposition groups to discuss the foundations of the Russian state in a never-before seen scope. The Muslims of Russia also took part in this discussion.

The main figure was Abdurasid Ibragimov. He was a Tatar Ulama who had emigrated to Istanbul in 1893 as protest against the Russian policy regarding Islam. In 1904, he was deported to Odessa on demand of the Russian government. He was soon let go there and minister of the interior Pyotr Sviatopolk-Mirsky even encouraged him to write a petition to the Tsar in the name of Russia's Muslims. With this petition, Ibragimov succeeded in starting a large-scale campaign of Muslims, especially of Jadids.

On January 23, 1905, leading members of Muslim Kazan first met, including not only Ulama but also intellectuals and merchants. They sent letters to Gaspirali and other Muslims in the Crimea and the Caucasus in which they invited them to a meeting in St. Petersburg. At a second meeting, they adopted a draft resolution in which they connected specifically Muslim demands (inclusion of Muslims in the process of drafting laws that concerned them, autonomy of the spiritual administration) with general liberal demands.

During the summer, Muslim delegations from the whole empire met in St. Petersburg. For the first time able to lead an encompassing discussion, a base consensus of Jadid reform interests soon became apparent. On April 8, the delegations arranged an All-Russian Muslim Congress in Nizhny Novgorod. In order to cover it from the authorities, it was scheduled to take part at the same time as the Nizhny Novgorod Fair in August 1905.

The participants of the first Muslim congress were not chosen by any formal criteria. They consisted out of the merchants who were present anyway as well as Ulama and intellectuals who had come specifically for the congress. After authorities had denied a formal permission for a meeting due to a "improper choice of place and time", the congress was moved to the river steamer Gustav Struve. The congress organisers tried to hinder some younger participants from joining by giving them a wrong start time. However, these participants rented a boat, chased the steamer and were let on board after a warning.

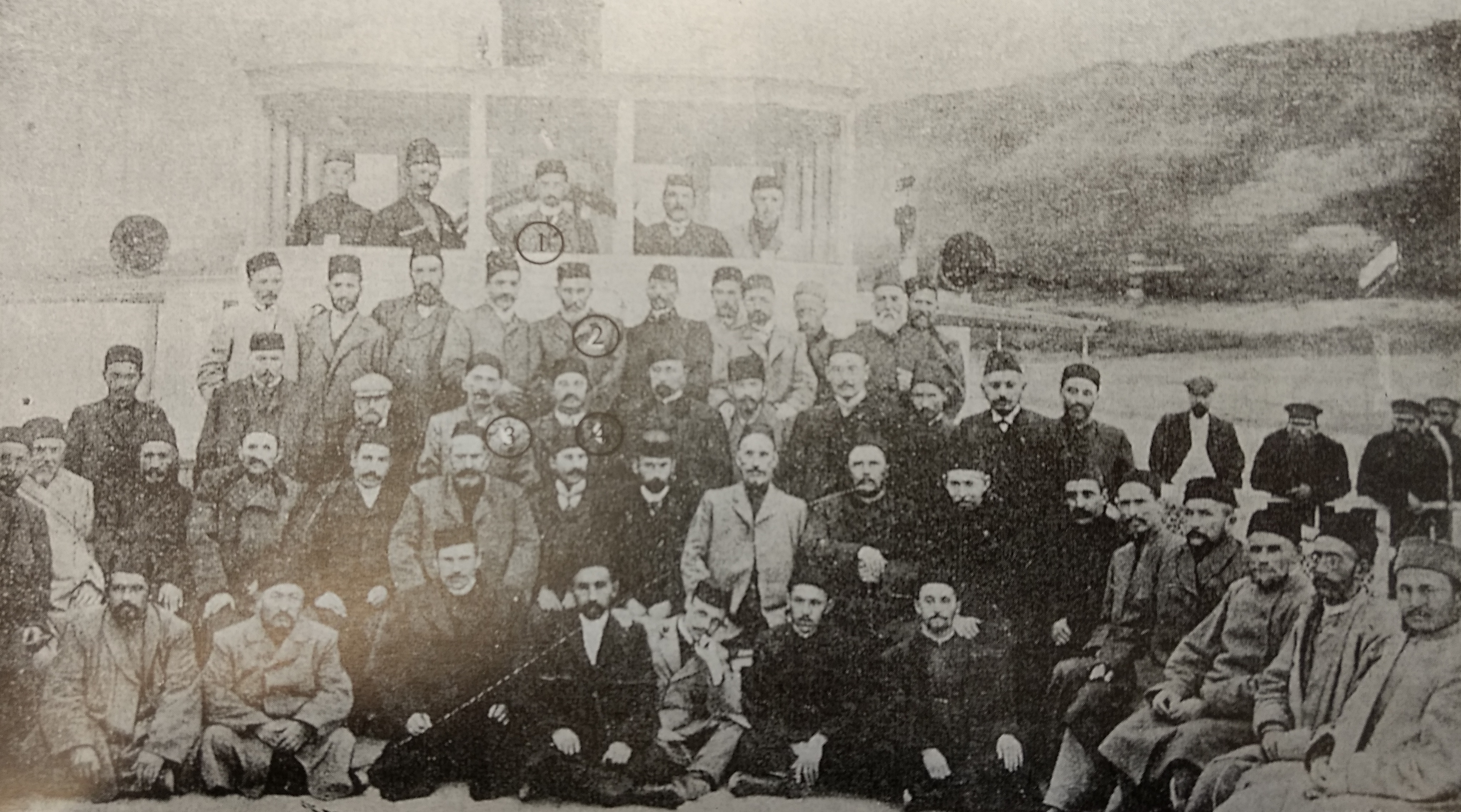
Participants of the First Congress of the Muslims of Russia, 1905. 1: Fatih Kerimi, 2: Abdurreshid Ibrahim, 3: Ismail Gasprinsky, 4: Alimardan bey Topchubashov

After a ten hour meeting, the delegates in a final statement pledged themselves to the founding of a Union of the Muslims of Russia. The question of whether this Ittifaq should be a party or some kind of big-tent organisation was tabled. A second congress was scheduled that should debate this and further questions. The debate between national Muslim unity and concrete political programme was to be a feature of the Russian Muslim movement until 1917.

=== Second congress ===
During the break between first and second congress, the Jadid activists of Kazan decided to take part in the upcoming Duma election as part of an existing party. On November 18, they met with different parties which presented their programmes. Unsatisfied, the Kazan Jadids, despite the first congress' decision not to found a party, formed a commission for an own political programme.

A regional congress was scheduled for December 3 to decide on the draft programme. After intensive discussion, an extraordinary All-Russian Congress seemed inevitable and was scheduled for January 16 in St. Petersburg. However, the delegates there would only be able to discuss made facts: Ibragimov and Yusuf Akçura, two of the most prominent Volga Tatars, had in the meantime joined the central executive committee of the Kadet Party.

In December 1905, there had already been a meeting with leading Kadets including Pavel Milyukov and Peter Struve in St. Petersburg. Afterwards, Ibragimov and Akçura attended the Kadet's second party congress. There, the Kadets adopted several of their suggestions to their party program: The traditional rights of Muslims should be respected, the Muftiate should be autonomous and school education should take place in the mother tongue of the pupils. Akçura was also voted into the Kadet's Kazan regional committee. There also was an agreement that Ittifaq would call for the election of the Kadets everywhere where its own candidates would have no chance of success.

None of this had been discussed with other Ittifaq members beforehand. Crimean Tatars and Transcaucasian Muslims saw Ibragimov's and Akçura's deal as a sign that Ittifaq was becoming an organisation for and by Volga Tatars. Gaspirali nearly did not come at all, because he did not want to work together with an opposition party.

"We are informed about nothing, everything is done in secret. Under these circumstances I cannot understand how one can talk of a Union..."

— Non-Volga Tatar delegate at the second congress

Several of the more radical delegates, organised around the newspaper Täng (Dawn) and ideologically nearer to the Social Revolutionaries, instead voted for an alliance with Socialist parties. Other members of the intelligentsia opposed the transformation of the Ittifaq into a political party because "Muslim workers and farmers cannot be brought together in one party with land owners and capitalists."

The Volga Tatars finally pushed through their proposal. The organisation of Ittifaq was changed and now showed much more party-like structures. For example, the congress adopted election procedures for the delegates to the annual party conferences. The Kazan proposal for the Ittifaq's party programme was discussed and adopted as "preliminary".

=== Third congress ===
The third All-Russian Muslim Congress, which began on August 16, 1906, was again overshadowed by Ibragimov doing something without prior consultation with the party. This time, he had sent a letter to the Interior Ministry, distancing himself in the name of the Ittifaq from Socialism, Anarchism and Pan-Islamism. Ibragimov then used that opportunity to again start a programmatic debate, which in essence followed that of the second congress. The left members of the Ittifaq more pointedly criticised the creation of a party ignoring the element of class, but acknowledged the Union's primacy despite Ibragimov's provocations.

"There must be associations on the basis on nationality and ethnic heritage. Despite the economic differences it is always possible to unite and organise a powerful party on the principles of nationality and religion."
- Yusuf Akçura at the Third All-Russian Muslim Congress

While arguing against the leftist members of the Ittifaq, Yusuf Akçura called on the examples of Poles and Czechs within Austria-Hungary as successful examples of parliamentary representations of ethnic groups. The congress established several commissions for the further debate of the party programme, but tabled their results until the next congress. At the same time, the newly established Central Committee of the Duma parliamentary group was tasked with the official registration of the party, which marked the de facto victory of the proponents of establishing a formal party.

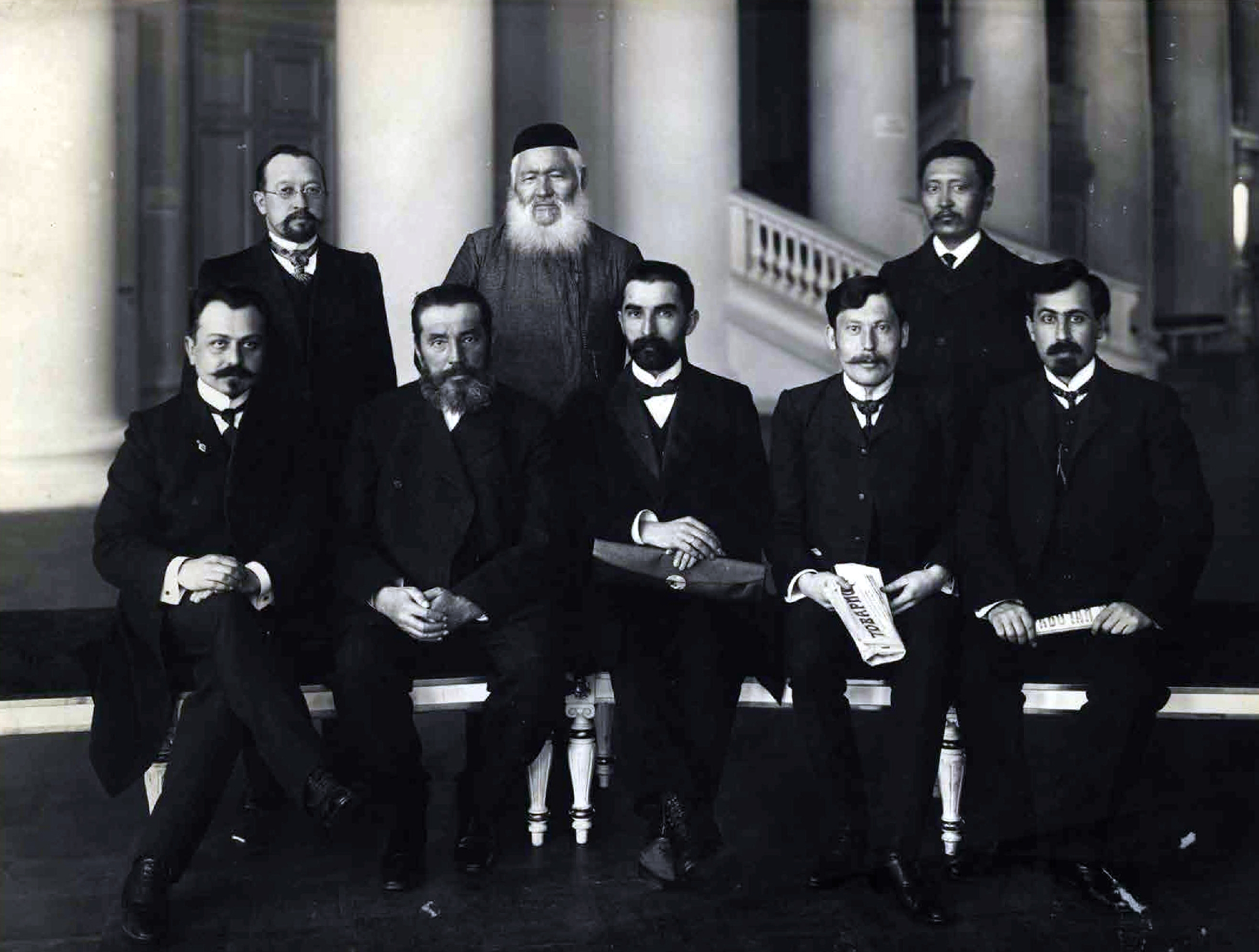
Muslim Duma representatives, 1907

=== In the Duma ===
25 Muslims were voted into the first Duma. They first joined the Kadet's parliamentary group according to their alliance, but formed their own group at the end of June. The Muslim delegates actively participated in the Duma, but all structures like party or press organs where still under construction. Six delegates signed the Vyborg Manifesto following the first Duma's dissolution and where as a result not allowed to stand for the second Duma's election.

In the second Duma, Muslims held 36 seats as a result of their alliance with the Kadets. Five representatives split from the main group, demanding a more radical agricultural policy, and formed the group of the "laborious Muslims", which oriented itself on the Trudoviks. In practice, they still mostly followed the Ittifaq line, especially voting together with the Kadets against Prime Minister Pyotr Stolypin's agricultural policies. Meanwhile, the Ittifaq increasingly institutionalised itself, for example by founding the newspaper Duma. However, this newspaper was taken over by sympathisers of the Social Revolutionaries and quickly closed by officials.

=== Decline ===
"Since it was created to strengthen the Russian state, the State Duma should also be Russian in spirit. The other nationalities of which the population of Our realm is composed should have their spokesmen in the State Duma, but they should not and will not be there in such number as to give them the possibility of decisive influence on purely Russian questions. In those border areas of the state where the population has not attained an adequate level of citizenship, elections to the State duma must temporarily be brought to an end."
- Imperial Manifesto on Duma reform, June 3, 1907

When Stolypin dissolved the second Duma and subsequently changed election procedures, Central Asian Muslims were completely barred from voting. This marked the end of the high phase of Muslim activity in the Duma.

The Ittifaq was also prohibited from formally registering as a party. Its delegates postponed the fourth All-Russian Muslim Congress in order to not unnecessarily displease the authorities. However, they achieved the opposite: The organisation structures, which in any way had never been very strong, simply began dissolving. In the third Duma, the Muslim group only had eight delegates. These also had to fight increasing nationalist tendencies within the Kadets. The Muslim movement therefore fell back to the regional level. Only in the press was the national discussion continued.

The conflict between Jadids and Kadimists, silent during the 1905 Revolution, now came to the forefront again. This also included campaigns by conservative rural Ulama, who in petitions declared lists of Jadids to be "pan-Turkists, pan-Islamists, and singers of the Marseillaise" who were collecting money for the Turkish fleet. Indeed, state repression against any form of "pan-Islamism" was stronger between 1910 and 1912 than ever before.

During a state-sanctioned fourth All-Russian Muslim Congress in the summer of 1914, the delegates could only agree on the old Jadid principles. However, these increasingly stood in contrast with a new generation of Muslim reformers, whose idea of nation was ethnic-cultural and not religious. This was especially the case with the Volga Tatars, whose press and literature increasingly were published in Tatar between 1905 and 1914. When the First World War dragged on, Muslim political activity came to a halt.

=== End during the revolution ===
The February Revolution and the return of about a million of highly politicised Muslim soldiers invigorated the Ittifaq, as it did other parties. In contrast to 1905, the movement now had mass backing and its activists had political experience and structures to call back on. Meanwhile, the alienation from the Kadets continued. The left wing of the Ittifaq continued to come closer to the Socialists ideologically, but stayed within the party.

However, the first All-Muslim Congress, which came together in Moscow on May 1, 1917, was to be the end of a united Muslim movement within Russia. The 900 delegates, among them 112 women and representatives of the provisional government, where split along the lines of "Federalists" and "Unitarists". The ones proposed a federal structure, the others cultural autonomy within a unity state inspired by Austromarxism. In the end, the congress voted to include the creation of federal republics within its programme by 446 votes to 271.

This angered the Volga Tatar delegates, who had called for cultural autonomy. This, the dominance of Volga Tatars in the newly-created Muslim National Council (Milli Sura) as well as their attempts at an alliance with the provisional government led to their complete isolation. At the second All-Muslim congress, which was held in July 1917 in Kazan, only Volga Tatar delegates were present. By calling for cultural autonomy for all Muslims against the wishes of the first congress, they completed the split within the movement.

== Noteworthy members ==
- Abdurrashid Ibrahimov
- Ismail Gaspirali
- Musa Bigiev
- Fatih Kerimi
- Alimardan Topchubashov
- Yusuf Akçura

== Literature ==
- Kanlidere, Ahmet, Reform within Islam. The Tajdid and Jadid Movement among the Kazan Tatars (1809-1917): Conciliation or Conflict? (Istanbul, 1997).
- Scheibert, Peter, Die russischen politischen Parteien von 1905 bis 1917 (Darmstadt, 1972).
- Khalid, Adeeb, The Politics of Muslim Cultural Reform. (Berkeley & Los Angeles, 1998).
- Bospflug, Elizabeth, The Muslim "Federalist Debate" in Revolutionary Russia, in: Ab Imperio (2017, Nr. 1), p. 131.
- Noack, Christian, Muslimischer Nationalismus im Russischen Reich. Nationsbildung und Nationalbewegung bei Tataren und Baschkiren, 1861-1917 (Stuttgart, 2000).
- Zenkovsky, Serge A., Pan-Turkism & Islam in Russia (Cambridge, 1960).
- Usmanova, Dilara M., The Activity of the Muslim faction of the State Duma and its significance in the formation of a political culture among the Muslim peoples of Russia (1906-1917), in: Kügelgen, Anke von; Kemper, Michael; Frank, Allen J.: Muslim Culture in Russian and Central Asia from the 18th to the Early 20th Centuries (Berlin, 1998).
- Usmanova, Dilara M., Die tatarische Presse 1905-1918: Quellen, Entwicklungsetappen und quantitative Analyse, in: Kemper, Michael; von Kügelgen, Anke; Yermakov, Dmitriy: Muslim Culture in Russia and Central Asia from the 18th to the Early 20th Centuries (Berlin, 1996), p. 239.
