= Abdurreshid Ibrahim =

Russian journalist and writer (1857–1944)

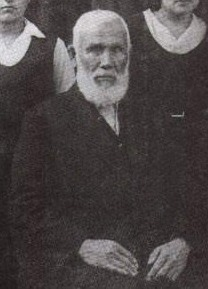
- Born: Ğabdräşit Ğomär ulı İbrahimov (in modern literary Tatar); April 23, 1857; Tara, Tobolsk Governorate, Russian Empire (now Omsk Oblast, Russia)
- Died: August 17, 1944 (aged 87); Tokyo, Japan
- Citizenship: Russian Empire (1857-1897); Ottoman Empire (1897-1933); Empire of Japan (1933-1944)
- Occupations: Imam, Qadi, Teacher
- Political party: Ittifaq al-Muslimin

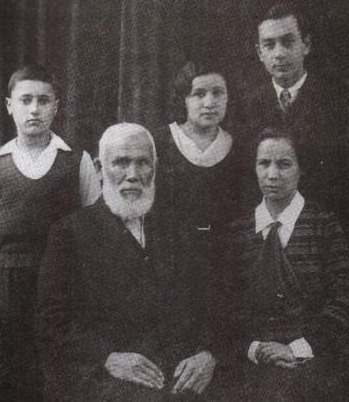
Abdurreshid Ibrahim with his children

Abdurreshid Ibrahim or Ibragimov (Russian: Абдурашид Гумерович Ибрагимов, Tatar: Габдрәшит Ибраһимов, Siberian Tatar: Әптрәшит Ипрағимов; 1857 – 1944) was a Russian-born Tatar Muslim alim, journalist, and traveller who initiated a movement in the first decade of the 20th century to unite the Crimean Tatars. He visited Japan during Meiji period and became the first imam of the Tokyo Mosque.

== Biography ==
Abdurreshid Ibrahim, or Ibragimov, was born on April 23, 1857, in the town of Tara, which is now in the Omsk Oblast. His ancestors were Turkic people by language and origin, and he identified himself as a Tatar. His father Gumer (Ğomär, i.e., Omar) was descended from the Siberian Bukharans.

He started school at seven and at the age of 10 entered the Almenevo village madrasa. Orphaned at 17, he left for Tyumen, where he continued his studies at the Yana Avyl madrasa, and then at the Qışqar village madrasa (now in the Arsky District of Tatarstan). In 1878–1879, he was a teacher in the Akmolinsk Oblast.

== In the Middle East ==
In 1879–1885, he continued his education in Medina, Mecca and Istanbul.

He returned to Russia in 1885, and from then on, he served as the imam-khatib of the cathedral mosque in Tara, where he was also taught at a madrasa. In 1892–1894, he served as the qadi of the Orenburg Muslim Spiritual Assembly.

In his youth, Ibragimov followed Jadid ideas and aimed to liberate all Muslim peoples from colonial oppression by "infidels". He visited the Ottoman Empire in 1897 to create a united anti-Russian Muslim front and traveled extensively throughout Europe, the Middle East, and Central Asia. In 1898, he was entitled to participate at the election of the public members of the Tara Town Council for the second four years term for 1898–1902.

In 1900, he began publishing the Chagatai-language magazine Mir'at (Mirror) in Saint Petersburg.

In 1902, he was entitled to participate at the elections of the public members of the Tara Town Council for the third four-year term for 1902–1906.

In 1902, Ibragimov, becoming an uncomfortable figure for Turkey, received the order from Sultan Abdul-Hamid II to leave the Ottoman Empire. In 1902–1903, he visited Japan for the first time, where he participated in anti-Russian propaganda. For this reason, Ibragimov, at the request of the Russian consul in Japan, was expelled from the country. Arriving in Istanbul in 1904, he was arrested, handed over to the Russian consul and sent under guard to Odessa. At the turn of 1905-1906 Ibrahimov was released. Being the former board member of the Muslim community of Orenburg, he became one of the leaders of the Ittifaq al-Muslimin movement and the organizer of several Muslim congresses. At the First All-Russian Muslim Congress in Nizhny Novgorod, A. Ibragimov's main rival was Ayaz Ishaki.

From 1905 to 1907, he was a member of the central committee of the Muslim party Ittifaq al-Muslimin (Union of The Muslims).

== Trip to China ==
Abdurreshid visited China in 1909. He stayed there from June to September trying to learn more about Chinese Muslims. He developed an amicable relationship with Wang Kuan, an ahong (Muslim cleric) at the Oxen Street Mosque in Beijing, though he was critical of Wang Kuan's Arabic skills. While he praised the commitment of Chinese Muslims to Islamic rules, he felt that the Chinese ahongs were stubborn when corrected, saying that:

The people who call themselves ulama and ahong do not deserve to be ulama, as compared with Muslims in Imperial Russia or other countries.

He was also critical of their traditional narrative of the entry of Islam into China:

The creed of the Chinese people in this respect is peculiar .... They say, "Islam had already entered into Kuntun [Guangdong] City from southern China in the era of peace [the era of Muhammad], and the second time, it came into Beijing from Chinese Turkestan". The faith of the Chinese in this respect is contrary to the whole of history and the Hadith. However, regarding this matter, all the Muslims in China are in accord. There are many books about this. [...] They call an old masjid in today's Kuntun [Guangdong] Seyyidan Sa’d bin Vakkâs Masjid.

Besides this, there is a family named Van Kuan [Wang Kuan] among the Chinese and they regard themselves as the offspring of Vakkâs ...... This history is indisputable to the Chinese and it would seem to be impossible to persuade them that this was not the case ..... Sa’d bin Vakkâs was a famed person among the Noble Companions and the ten companions who were promised Paradise, and his biography is well known to Muslims. If Vakkâs had been an envoy [from the Arabs to China], the great Hadith scholars would have recorded it ... because some of them would have understood that anything that happened in the era of our Prophet Muhammad would have to be written down, without ignoring the slightest detail. If an envoy had been dispatched to China like this, Hadith scholars should have recorded it.

However, it is very natural that the Chinese would not like to have their history denied like that. For a very long time, for whatever reason, each nation's [millet] confidence in its history has been almost a matter of faith, no nation has ever wanted to have it denied, let alone refuted. This is a very strange condition, and in my opinion, it is the evidence that human beings are blind.

== Bibliography ==
- アブデュルレシト・イブラヒム（小松香織、小松久男訳） 『ジャポンヤ：イスラム系ロシア人の見た明治日本』 第三書館、1991年 (ISBN 978-4807491285)
- 小松久男「アブデュルレシト・イブラヒム」大塚和夫ほか編『岩波イスラーム辞典』岩波書店、2002年 (ISBN 978-4000802017)
- 小松久男『イブラヒム、日本への旅』刀水書房、2008年 (ISBN 978-4-88708-505-3)
