= Qışqar =

Qışqar Кышкар
- Selo
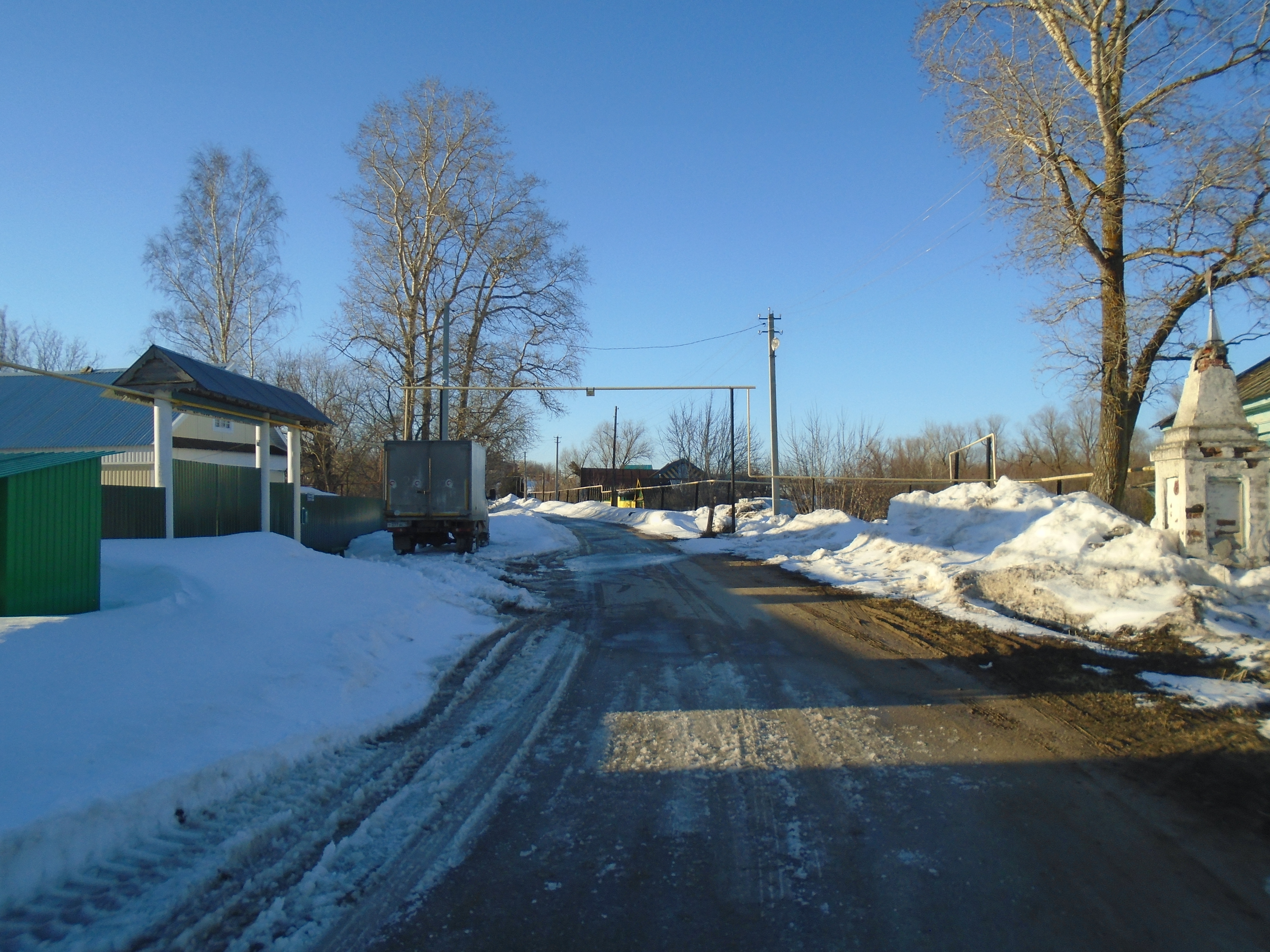
- Kshkar, Arsky district, Tatarstan.

- Location within Tatarstan
- Country: Russia
- Region: Tatarstan
- District: Arça District
- Time zone: UTC+3:00

Qışqar (Tatar: Кышкар, romanized: Qışqar, Russian: Кшкар) is a rural locality (a selo) in Arça District, Tatarstan. The population was 229 as of 2010.

== Geography ==
Qışqar is located 31 km northwest of Arça, district's administrative centre, and 97 km northeast of Qazan, republic's capital, by road.

== History ==
The village already existed during the period of the Khanate of Qazan.

From the 17th to first half of the 19th centuries village's residents belonged to the social estate of state peasants.

The village for its madrasa, which was well-known in the area. By the beginning of the twentieth century, village had 2 mosques, a madrasa, a windmill and 4 small shops.

Before the creation of Tatar ASSR in 1920 was a part of Qazan Uyezd of Qazan Governorate. Since 1920 was a part of Arça Canton; after the creation of districts in Tatar ASSR (Tatarstan) in Tuqay (later Ätnä) (1930–1959), Tuqay (former Qızıl Yul) (1959–1963) and Arça districts.

== Notable objects ==
- Qışqar mosque
