= Kiçüçat =

Kiçüçat Кичүчат
- selo
- Location within Tatarstan
- Country: Russia
- Region: Tatarstan
- District: Älmät District

Population (2017)
  - Total: 896
- Time zone: UTC+3:00

Kiçüçat (Tatar: Кичүчат, romanized: Kiçüçat) is a rural locality (a selo) in Älmät District, Tatarstan. The population was 900 as of 2010. Kiçüçat is located 25 km from Älmät, district's administrative centre, and 239 km from Ԛazаn, republic's capital, by road. The village was established in 18th century. There are 16 streets in the village.
