= August 1948 Session of VASKhNIL =

- Date: July 31 – August 5, 1948
- Venue: Moscow
- Country: Soviet Union
- Participants: Soviet agronomists, biologists, philosophers, VASKhNIL members

The August Session of VASKhNIL in 1948 (Moscow, July 31 – August 7, 1948) was an extended meeting of the All-Union Academy of Agricultural Sciences named after V. I. Lenin (VASKhNIL), organized by T. D. Lysenko and his supporters, with the approval of the Central Committee of the Communist Party of the Soviet Union. It was a key event in the suppression of research in genetics in the USSR and confrontation between "Michurinist agrobiology" and classical genetics.

The resolution adopted at the session had negative consequences for the normal development of biological sciences in the USSR – classical genetics was declared discredited, and scientists engaged in this research were dismissed from educational and scientific institutions or transferred to other fields.

== History ==
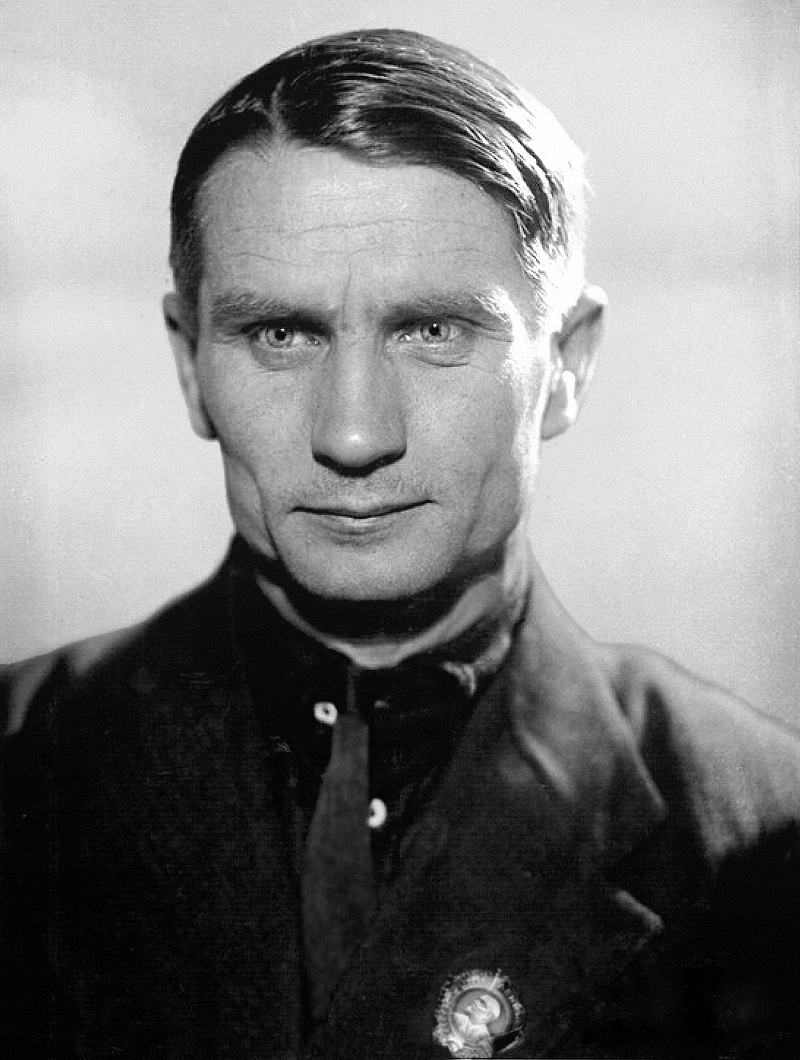
Trofim Lysenko, 1938

At the end of the war, the monopolistic position of Lysenkoist biology noticeably weakened. S. I. Vavilov, the brother of the repressed N. I. Vavilov, became President of the USSR Academy of Sciences. Cooperation with the "bourgeois" countries of the anti-Hitler coalition began.

In April 1948, T. D. Lysenko's position became so precarious that he wrote a letter to I. V. Stalin, in which he stated that it had become "difficult for him to work" and he was literally "disheartened" due to accusations from supporters of the "metaphysical direction in biology," voiced by none other than the head of the Science Department of the Propaganda Directorate of the CPSU(b) Central Committee, Yuri Andreevich Zhdanov. Since Stalin sympathized with Lysenko, it was decided to hold a session to proclaim the priority of "Michurinist agrobiology" over genetics as a solution to the problem of criticism from geneticists.

The preparation for the session was carried out in complete secrecy by T. D. Lysenko and his followers, who received direct approval from I. V. Stalin, despite an attempt by Yu. A. Zhdanov, who oversaw science issues in the CPSU Central Committee, to expose the Lysenkoists. Neither the President of the USSR Academy of Sciences, S. I. Vavilov, nor the Academician-Secretary of the academy's Department of Biology, L. A. Orbeli, were informed about the preparation of the session.

Many VASKhNIL members who were opponents of Lysenko were not notified of the upcoming event. To secure a stable majority, Lysenko, bypassing the generally accepted practice of election to the academy, had Stalin personally sign a list approving a group of his supporters, who lacked authority in the scientific community, as full members (academicians) of VASKhNIL.

On July 15, 1948, the Council of Ministers of the USSR decreed the addition of 35 new full members – academicians – to VASKhNIL. On July 28, 1948, the newspaper Pravda printed the list of new academicians, Lysenko's supporters, and announced: "The next July session, dedicated to discussing the report of Academician T. D. Lysenko on the topic 'On the Situation in Soviet Biological Science,' will take place at the end of July of this year in the city of Moscow."

The report for the session was prepared by Lysenko and his assistants under direct instructions from above by July 23, 1948, and was sent to Stalin for review. The initial draft of the report extensively used terms like "bourgeois genetics," "bourgeois science," "anti-Marxist biology," etc. One section of the report (§ 2) was notably titled: "The foundations of bourgeois biology are false." According to Lysenko, true, Michurinist genetics could not develop under capitalism, "but there is another one there – their own, bourgeois genetics..." According to Lysenko, bourgeois science, serving the interests of the ruling class, "inevitably includes much false knowledge that does not correspond to objective reality... This speaks to the fundamental principle we must never forget: any science is class-based." Lysenko asserted that bourgeois genetics and dialectical-materialist Michurinist biology "have clashed in an irreconcilable struggle," the contradictions between them being, ultimately, a consequence of the antagonistic relations of hostile classes.

However, during Stalin's editing of the report, Lysenko's original terminology was radically altered. The opposition "bourgeois science" vs. "dialectical-materialist science" was replaced by the contrast: "reactionary (idealistic) and progressive (materialistic, Soviet) science." The section "The foundations of bourgeois biology are false" was completely deleted due to Stalin's rejection of the idea of class-based sciences.

On July 27, T. D. Lysenko was received in I. V. Stalin's office; also present were Beria, Malenkov, Mikoyan, Bulganin, and Kaganovich.

== The session ==
The VASKhNIL session took place from July 31 to August 7, 1948.

At the session, Academician T. D. Lysenko delivered his famous report "On the Situation in Biological Science." In his report, Lysenko emphasized the role of the external environment in selection and evolution (see Lamarckism), called for a greater practical focus in biology and agriculture, criticized the "Morganists" for their enthusiasm for research on fruit flies (Drosophila), and professed his commitment to Michurin's teachings. Furthermore, to lend authority to his words, Lysenko hinted that I. V. Stalin had read and fully approved his report. The main individuals targeted by T. D. Lysenko and his supporters were primarily the evolutionist I. I. Schmalhausen and the geneticists N. P. Dubinin and A. R. Zhebrak.

The intensity of the conflict between the two irreconcilable camps of scientists is illustrated by the legend, recounted by S. E. Shnol, of a fight between Professors I. A. Rapoport and I. I. Prezent during the latter's speech. It was said that Rapoport threw a water carafe at Prezent. Rapoport later denied this incident.

The session ended with the complete rout of genetics. I. A. Rapoport, who had sharply defended genetics as a science at the session and was the only one who refused to accept the presidium's decision, was expelled from the CPSU(b).

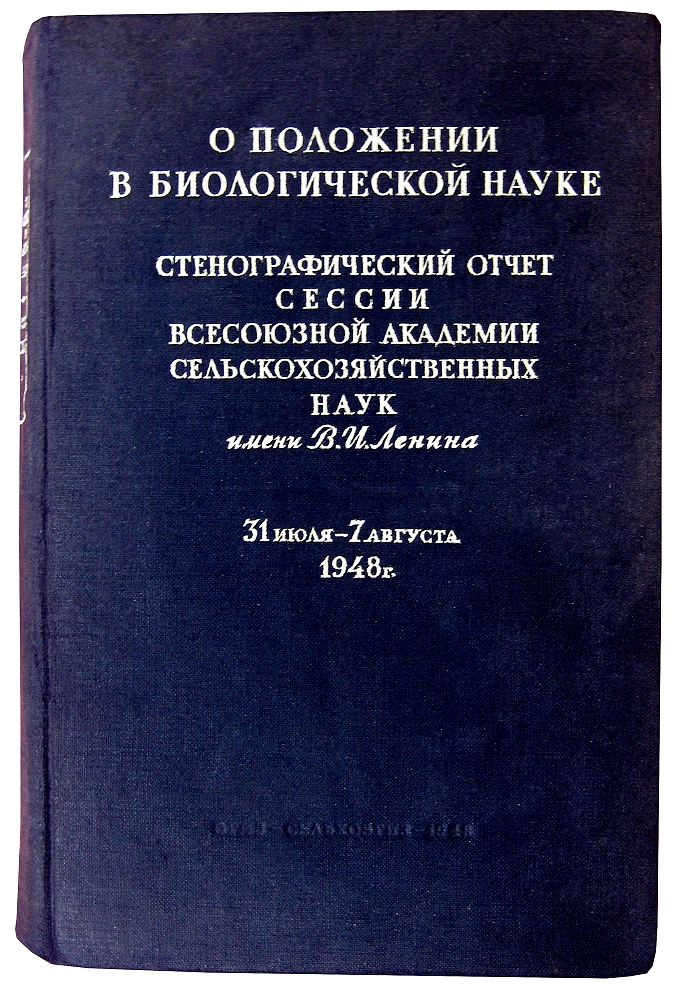
Transcript Book, 1948

The proceedings of the session were covered daily by the Soviet press. These materials, appropriately processed, were prescribed for study at mandatory political education classes. (Note: Over eight days of "public discussion," which filled five hundred and thirty-one pages of the verbatim transcript, neither Nikolai Vavilov, nor his institute in Leningrad, nor the experimental station in Pushkin, nor the famous seed collection were mentioned once.)

The CPSU(b) Central Committee entrusted the publication of the VASKhNIL session materials to the State Publishing House of Agricultural Literature:

- to issue Academician T. D. Lysenko's report "On the Situation in Biological Science" and his concluding remarks as a separate brochure in a print run of 300,000 copies within 3 days (signed for printing on August 12).
- the publishing house was obliged to release the verbatim transcript of the VASKhNIL session by August 29, with a print run of 200,000 copies.
- The Ministry of the Forest and Paper Industry was obliged to supply the publishing house with 200 tons of printing paper for the publication of the VASKhNIL session materials, at the expense of reduced deliveries to the state reserve under the 1948 plan.

== Consequences for science in the USSR ==
The August Session of VASKhNIL in 1948 became the darkest page in the history of biology in the USSR. Following a similar scenario, physiology, cytology, virology, and other sciences were soon crushed in the USSR. The session signaled the USSR's course towards a special path for the development of national science and its separation from the world community of scientists. The goal was to bring the research process itself under complete ideological and political control. To this end, a huge number of scientists were expelled from institutes and higher education institutions.

In the newspaper Pravda, the geneticist A. R. Zhebrak published a letter of justification: "As long as both directions in Soviet genetics were recognized by our Party, I persistently defended my views, which on particular issues differed from the views of Academician Lysenko. But now, after it has become clear to me that the main tenets of the Michurinist direction in Soviet genetics have been approved by the Central Committee of the CPSU(b), I, as a Party member, do not consider it possible for myself to remain on those positions which have been recognized as erroneous by the Central Committee of our Party."

On August 23, 1948, the Minister of Higher Education of the USSR, S. V. Kaftanov, issued Order No. 1208 "On the state of teaching biological disciplines in universities and on measures to strengthen the biological faculties with qualified personnel of Michurinist biologists." According to this order, commissions were established in higher education institutions to revise curricula for all academic disciplines, change the topics of postgraduate students' candidate dissertations, etc.

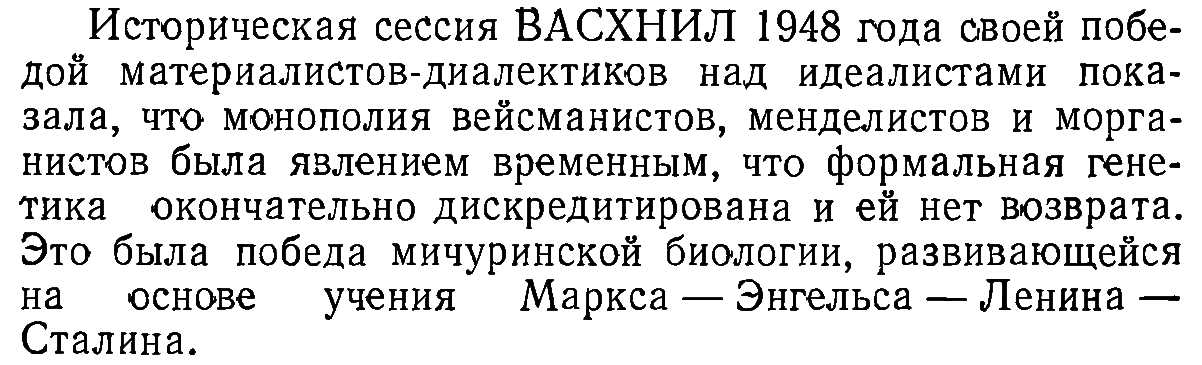
A quote showing the crisis in Soviet biology after the VASKhNIL session, Lepeshinskaya, 1952

Widespread dismissals or transfers of geneticists to other fields were carried out. The number of geneticists subjected to administrative persecution at this time is estimated at 300 people. They were replaced by Lysenko's supporters. Particular attention was paid to the training of new "Michurinist" biologists: additional enrollments were announced for the biology faculties at Moscow and Leningrad Universities, and the teaching staff was almost completely replaced. "The Fundamentals of Darwinism" at both universities, trusting no one else, was taught by Lysenko's most loyal follower, I. I. Prezent (who had no biological education).

After the VASKhNIL session in 1948, many foreign members resigned from the USSR Academy of Sciences in protest against the persecution, for example, the English physiologists Dale, Muller, and some others.

For nearly twenty years, "Mendelism" became a derogatory term. The Lysenkoists made the name of the modest practitioner-horticulturist I. V. Michurin, who had little interest in theory and was interested in Mendel's work, their banner.

In addition to the August session, which crushed genetics, the March session of the USSR Academy of Sciences in 1950, under the pretext of developing the scientific legacy of I. P. Pavlov, saw the crushing of physiology and cytology.

On August 24–26, 1948, an extended meeting of the Presidium of the USSR Academy of Sciences was held on the state and tasks of biological science in the institutes and institutions of the USSR Academy of Sciences, at which the decision of the VASKhNIL session was supported. The resolution pointed out the unfavorable situation of science from an ideological and practical point of view. The Presidium of the USSR Academy of Sciences proposed that all organizations of the AS USSR system hold a broad discussion on the ideological orientation of each institute's research topics and their practical significance in science and the national economy.

Discussions on the ideological state in various sciences took place or were planned:

- Geological Sciences – in November 1948, an extended session of the academic council of the Institute of Geological Sciences (IGN AS USSR) was held.
- Oil and gas industry – discussed in Leningrad; Gubkin's theory on the origin of oil was recognized as the only correct one.
- Physics – a meeting was planned to be held at the Moscow House of Scientists (600 delegates); the organizing committee worked from December 30, 1948, to March 16, 1949; the meeting was postponed several times and did not take place.
- Physiology and medicine – in 1950 (the Pavlov Session), Lysenko's teachings in biological and medical sciences were supported.

Only by 1965 did the USSR receive an official conclusion from commissions of VASKhNIL and the USSR Academy of Sciences stating that T. D. Lysenko's scientific work had been conducted unreliably.

== See also ==
- Lysenkoism, Lamarckism
- November 1948 Session of the Institute of Geological Sciences of the USSR Academy of Sciences

== Literature ==
- Lysenko T. D. O polozhenii v biologicheskoy nauke: Doklad na sessii VASKhNIL 31 iyulya 1948 g. M.: Selkhozgiz, 1948. 64 p. Print run 300,000. (Signed for printing on August 12, 1948.)
- O polozhenii v biologicheskoy nauke: Stenograficheskiy otchyot sessii Vsesoyuznoy akademii selskokhozyaystvennykh nauk imeni V. I. Lenina, 31 iyulya – 7 avgusta 1948. Editorial board: V. N. Stoletov, A. M. Sirotin, G. K. Objedkov. Moscow: OGIZ-Selkhozgiz: August 21, 1948. 536 pages. (in Russian)
- Pringle, Peter (2008). The murder of Nikolai Vavilov: The story of Stalin's persecution of one of the great scientists of the twentieth century. Simon & Schuster. ISBN 978-1-4165-6602-1.
- News and photo // Vechernyaya Moskva (newspaper of the MGK CPSU(b) and the Mossoviet). 1948. No. 185 (7467), August 6. p. 2.
