= Lysenkoism =

Pseudoscientific Soviet biological theory

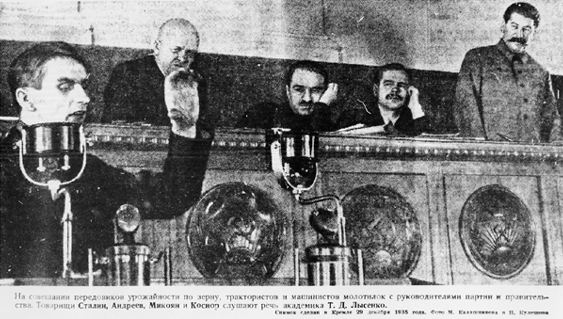
Trofim Lysenko speaking at the Kremlin in 1935; behind him are (left to right) Stanislav Kosior, Anastas Mikoyan, Andrei Andreev and Joseph Stalin

Lysenkoism (Note: Russian: лысенковщина, romanized: lysenkovshchina [lɨˈsʲenkəfɕːɪnə]; Ukrainian: лисенківщина, romanized: lysenkivščyna [lɪˈsɛnkiu̯ʃtʃɪnɐ]) was a pseudoscientific political campaign led by the Soviet biologist Trofim Lysenko against genetics and science-based agriculture in the mid-20th century, rejecting natural selection in favour of a form of Lamarckism, as well as expanding upon the techniques of vernalization and grafting.

More than 3,000 mainstream biologists were dismissed or imprisoned, and numerous scientists were executed in the Soviet campaign to suppress scientific opponents. The president of the Soviet Agriculture Academy, Nikolai Vavilov, who had been Lysenko's mentor, but later denounced him, was sent to prison and died there, while Soviet genetics research was effectively destroyed. Research and teaching in the fields of neurophysiology, cell biology, and many other biological disciplines were harmed or banned.

The government of the Soviet Union (USSR) supported the campaign, and Joseph Stalin personally edited a speech by Lysenko in a way that reflected his support for what would come to be known as Lysenkoism, despite his skepticism toward Lysenko's assertion that all science is class-orientated in nature. Lysenko served as the director of the USSR's Lenin All-Union Academy of Agricultural Sciences. Other countries of the Eastern Bloc including the People's Republic of Poland, the Republic of Czechoslovakia, and the German Democratic Republic accepted Lysenkoism as the official "new biology", to varying degrees, as did the People's Republic of China for some years.

== Context ==
August Weismann's germ plasm theory stated that the hereditary material, the germ plasm, is transmitted only by the reproductive organs. Somatic cells (of the body) develop afresh in each generation from the germ plasm. There is no way that changes made to somatic cells can affect the next generation, contrary to Lamarckism.

Mendelian genetics, the science of heredity, developed into an experimentally based field of biology at the start of the 20th century through the work of August Weismann, Thomas Hunt Morgan, and others, building on the rediscovered work of Gregor Mendel. They showed that the characteristics of an organism are carried by inherited genes, which were located on chromosomes in each cell's nucleus. Genes can be affected by random changes (mutations), and can be shuffled and recombined during sexual reproduction, but are otherwise passed on unchanged from parent to offspring. Beneficial changes can propagate through a population by natural selection or, in agriculture, by plant breeding.

Some Marxists, however, perceived a fissure between Marxism and Darwinism. Specifically, the issue is that while the "struggle for survival" in Marxism applies to a social class as a whole (the class struggle), the struggle for survival in Darwinism is decided by individual random mutations. This was deemed a liberal doctrine, against the Marxist framework of "immutable laws of history" and the spirit of collectivism. In contrast, Lamarckism proposed that an organism can somehow pass on characteristics that it has acquired during its lifetime to its offspring, implying that changing the body can affect the genetic material in the germ line. To these Marxists, a "neo-Lamarckism" was deemed more compatible with Marxism.

The Marxist principle of partiinost (party spirit) held that science is tied to class interests: scientists had a duty to serve the working class. This caused scientific findings to be judged by their economic and political utility, and allowed for questionable work. Marxist revolutionary Nikolai Bukharin downplayed realist interpretations of nature. He said that science had to show how to manipulate natural phenomena to serve the interests of the proletarian class. Because genetics was linked to eugenics and social Darwinism, it was rejected as bourgeois, regardless of the evidence for it.

Marxism–Leninism, which became the official ideology in Stalin's USSR, incorporated Darwinian evolution as a foundational doctrine, providing a scientific basis for its state atheism. Initially, the Lamarckian principle of inheritance of acquired traits was considered a legitimate part of evolutionary theory, and Darwin himself supported it. Although the Mendelian view had largely replaced Lamarckism in western biology by 1925, it persisted in Soviet doctrine. Besides the fervent "old style" Darwinism of Marx and Engels which included elements of Lamarckism, two fallacious experimental results supported it in the USSR. First, Ivan Pavlov, who discovered conditioned reflex, announced in 1923 that it can be inherited in mice; and his subsequent withdrawal of this claim was ignored by Soviet ideologists. Second, Ivan Michurin interpreted his work on plant breeding as proof of the inheritance of acquired traits. Michurin advocated directed plant breeding by environmental control: "We cannot wait for favors from nature: we must wrest them from her".

Kliment Timiryazev, a popularizer of science in Russia, had sympathies with communism, and allied with the new Soviet republic. This made his views more orthodox and widely known. When gene theory rose in early 1900s, some gene theorists promoted saltative forms of mutationism as an alternative to gradualist Darwinism, and Timiryazev vigorously argued against it. Timiryazev's views influenced many, including Michurin.

Soviet agriculture around 1930 was in a crisis due to Stalin's forced collectivisation of farms and extermination of kulak farmers. The resulting Soviet famine of 1932–1933 provoked the government to search for a technical solution which would maintain their central political control.

== In the Soviet Union ==
=== Lysenko's biological claims ===
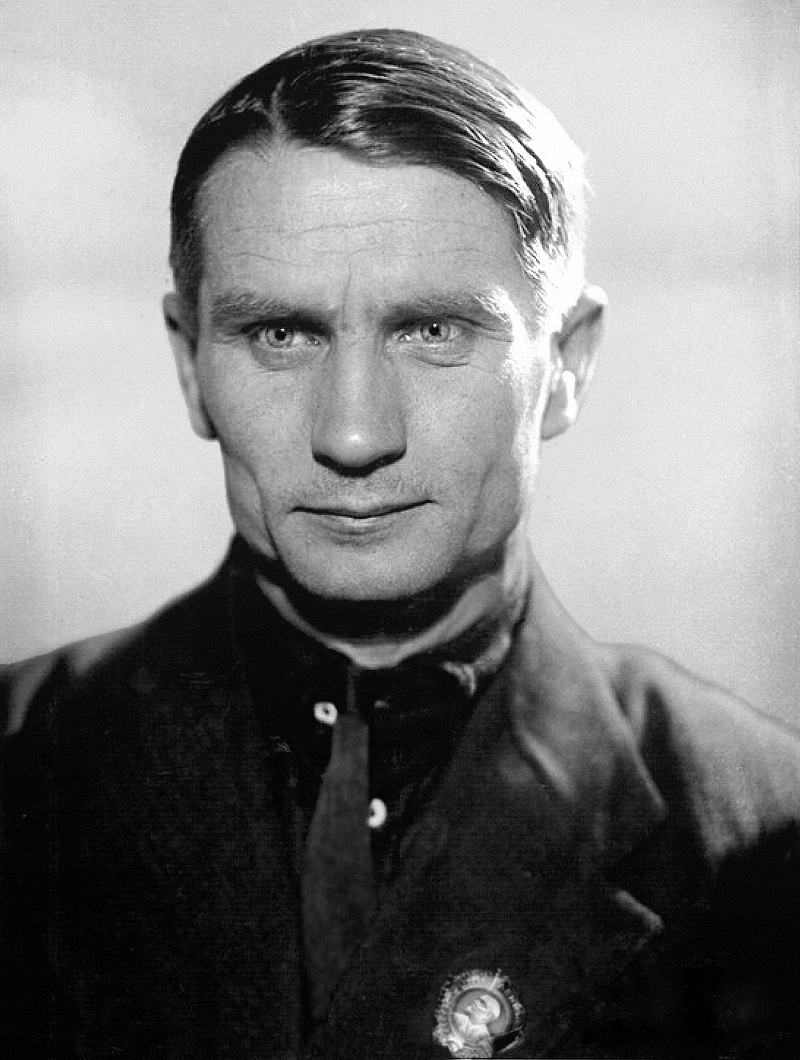
Lysenko in 1938

In 1928, rejecting natural selection and Mendelian genetics, Trofim Lysenko claimed to have developed agricultural techniques which could radically increase crop yields. These included vernalization, species transformation (one species turning into another), inheritance of acquired characteristics, and vegetative hybridisation (see below). He claimed in particular that vernalization, exposing wheat seeds to humidity and low temperature, could greatly increase crop yield. He claimed further that he could transform one species, Triticum durum (durum spring wheat), into Triticum vulgare (common autumn wheat), through 2 to 4 years of autumn planting. This species transition he claimed to occur without an intermediate form. However, this was already known to be impossible since T. durum is a tetraploid with 28 chromosomes (4 sets of 7), while T. vulgare is hexaploid with 42 chromosomes (6 sets). This objection did not faze Lysenko, as he claimed that the chromosome number changed as well.

Lysenko claimed that the concept of a gene was a "bourgeois invention", and he denied the presence of any "immortal substance of heredity" or "clearly defined species", which he claimed belong to Platonic metaphysics rather than strictly materialist Marxist science. Instead, he proposed a "Marxist genetics" postulating an unlimited possibility of transformation of living organisms through environmental changes in the spirit of Marxian dialectical transformation, and in parallel to the Party's program of creating the New Soviet Man and subduing nature for his benefit. Lysenko refused to admit random mutations, stating that "science is the enemy of randomness".

Lysenkoist vegetative hybridisation implying an effect of scion on stock when a fruit tree is grafted. Lysenko's Lamarckian conception could imaginably be achieved by horizontal gene transfer, though there is no evidence for this.

Lysenko further claimed that Lamarckian inheritance of acquired characteristics occurred in plants, as in the "eyes" of potato tubers, though the genetic differences in these plant parts were already known to be non-heritable somatic mutations. He claimed that when a tree is grafted, the scion permanently changes the heritable characteristics of the stock. In modern biological theory, such a change is imaginable through horizontal gene transfer; however, there is no evidence that this actually occurs, and Lysenko rejected the mechanism of genes entirely.

Lysenko denied that intraspecific competition occurred in nature because the reality of competition between individuals validated that overpopulation and limited resources were real phenomena. He claimed that the only biological competition that occurs is competition between species, not within one.

=== Rise ===
Isaak Izrailevich Prezent, a biologist politically out of favour, brought Lysenko to public attention. He portrayed Lysenko as a genius who had developed a revolutionary technique which could lead to the triumph of Soviet agriculture, a thrilling possibility for a Soviet society suffering through Stalin's famines. Lysenko became a favorite of the Soviet propaganda machine, which overstated his successes, trumpeted his faked experimental results, and omitted any mention of his failures. State media published enthusiastic articles such as "Siberia is transformed into a land of orchards and gardens" and "Soviet people change nature", while anyone opposing Lysenko was presented as a defender of "mysticism, obscurantism and backwardness."

Lysenko's political success was mostly due to his appeal to the Communist Party and Soviet ideology. His attack on the "bourgeois pseudoscience" of modern genetics and the proposal that plants can rapidly adjust to a changed environment suited the ideological battle in both agriculture and Soviet society. Following the disastrous collectivization efforts of the late 1920s, Lysenko's new methods were seen by Soviet officials as paving the way to an "agricultural revolution." Lysenko himself was from a peasant family and was an enthusiastic advocate of Leninism. The Party-controlled newspapers applauded Lysenko's practical "success" and questioned the motives of his critics, ridiculing the timidity of academics who urged the patient, impartial observation required for science. Lysenko was admitted into the hierarchy of the Communist Party, and was put in charge of agricultural affairs.

He used his position to denounce biologists as "fly-lovers and people haters", and to decry traditional biologists as "wreckers" working to sabotage the Soviet economy. He denied the distinction between theoretical and applied biology, and rejected general methods such as control groups and statistics:

We biologists do not take the slightest interest in mathematical calculations, which confirm the useless statistical formulae of the Mendelists … We do not want to submit to blind chance … We maintain that biological regularities do not resemble mathematical laws.

Lysenko presented himself as a follower of Ivan Vladimirovich Michurin, a well-known and well-liked Soviet horticulturist, but unlike Michurin, Lysenko insisted on using only non-genetic techniques such as hybridization and grafting.

Support from Joseph Stalin increased Lysenko's popularity. In 1935, Lysenko compared his opponents in biology to the peasants who still resisted the Soviet government's collectivization strategy, saying that the opponents of his theories were opponents of Marxism. Stalin was in the audience for this speech, and was the first to stand and applaud, calling out "Bravo, Comrade Lysenko. Bravo." Stalin personally made encouraging edits to a speech by Lysenko, despite the dictator's skepticism toward Lysenko's assertion that all science is class-orientated. The official support emboldened Lysenko and gave him and Prezent free rein to slander any geneticists who still spoke out against him. After Lysenko became head of the Soviet Academy of Agricultural Sciences, classical genetics began to be called "fascist science" and many of Lysenkoism's opponents, such as his former mentor Nikolai Ivanovich Vavilov, were imprisoned or executed, although not on Lysenko's personal orders.

During 1947 October, Lysenko and Stalin exchanged multiple letters. Lysenko promised Stalin to breed branching wheat into a yield of 15,000 kg/ha. At that time, the most productive wheat breed under exceptionally favorable conditions could achieve 2,000 kg/ha. Lysenko's letter to Stalin, dated October 27, 1947 read;

Mendelism-Morganism, Weissmanist neo-Darwinism ... are not developed in Western capitalist countries for the purposes of agriculture, but rather serve reactionary purposes of eugenics, racism, etc. There is no relationship between agricultural practices and the theory of bourgeois genetics.

=== Peak ===
From July 31 to August 7, 1948, the Academy of Agricultural Sciences (VASKhNIL) held a week-long session (August 1948 Session of VASKhNIL), organized by Lysenko and approved by Stalin. At the end of it, Lysenkoism was declared as "the only correct theory." As Lysenko performatively spoke at the end, "the Central Committee of the Communist Party has examined my report and approved it". Attendants recognized this as the birth of a new orthodoxy. Of the 8 scientists who advocated genetics during the session, 3 immediately announced repentance.

Soviet scientists were required to denounce any work that contradicted Lysenko, and criticism was denounced as "bourgeois" or "fascist". The Ministry of Higher Education commanded all biological institutes to immediately follow the Lysenko orthodoxy:

The Central University Administration and the Administration of Cadres are directed to review within two months all departments of biological faculties to free them from all opposed to Michurinist biology and to strengthen them by appointing Michurinists to them. Point 6 of the Order No. 1208 (August 23, 1948)

For several months, similar central directives dismissed scientists, withdrew textbooks, and required the removal of any references to heredity in higher education. There was an order to destroy all stocks of Drosophila, a common model organism for research in genetics. Leading geneticists were being monitored by secret agents from the State Security Service.

The same wave of propaganda supported a number of other pseudo-scientific "new Marxist sciences" in the Soviet academy, in fields such as linguistics and art. Pravda reported the invention of a perpetual motion engine, confirming Engels' claim that energy dissipated in one place must concentrate somewhere else.

In 1948, the film Michurin portrayed Michurin as an ideal Soviet scientist, bringing the propaganda to the masses. Published songbooks included songs praising Lysenko, "He walks the Michurin path/With firm tread;/He protects us from being duped/by Mendelist-Morganists."

In Lysenko and his followers' political claim, the "Weismannist-Mendelist-Morganist" theory was reactionary and idealistic, a tool of the bourgeois, while the "Michurinist" theory was progressive and materialistic. The victory of Michurinism was framed as a victory of socialism over capitalism. Some even traced Hitler's racial policies to the genetic theory.

A prominent promoter of Lysenkoism was the biologist Olga Lepeshinskaya, who attempted to demonstrate abiogenesis of cells and tissues from "vital substance". She delivered a speech in 1950 in which she equated all of the "bourgeois" heresies:

In our country there are no longer classes hostile to each other, and the struggle of idealists against dialectical materialists still, depending on whose interests it defends, has the character of a class struggle. Indeed, the followers of Virchow, Weismann, Mendel and Morgan, who speak of the invariability of the gene and deny the influence of the external environment, are the preachers of the pseudo-scientific teachings of the bourgeois eugenicists and of all perversions in genetics, on the soil of which grew the racial theory of fascism in the capitalist countries. The Second World War was unleashed by the forces of imperialism, which also had racism in its arsenal.

— Olga Lepeshinskaya

Perhaps the only opponents of Lysenkoism during Stalin's lifetime to escape liquidation were from the small community of Soviet nuclear physicists: according to Tony Judt, "it is significant that Stalin left his nuclear physicists alone and never presumed to second guess their calculations. Stalin may well have been mad but he was not stupid."

=== Effects on scientists ===
Genetics was eventually banned in the Soviet Union. Over 3,000 biologists were fired, and numerous scientists were imprisoned, or executed for attempting to oppose Lysenkoism, and genetics research was effectively destroyed until the death of Stalin in 1953. Secret research facilities such as sharashka were where numerous scientists ended up imprisoned.

From 1934 to 1940, under Lysenko's admonitions and with Stalin's approval, many geneticists were executed (including Izrail Agol, Solomon Levit, Grigorii Levitskii, Georgii Karpechenko and Georgii Nadson) or sent to labor camps. The famous Soviet geneticist and president of the Agriculture Academy, Nikolai Vavilov, was arrested in 1940 and died in prison in 1943. In 1936, the American geneticist Hermann Joseph Muller, who had moved to the Leningrad Institute of Genetics with his Drosophila fruit flies, was criticized as bourgeois, capitalist, imperialist, and a promoter of fascism, and he returned to America via Republican Spain. Iosif Rapoport, who worked on mutagens, refused to publicly repudiate chromosome theory of heredity, and suffered several years as a geological lab assistant. Dmitry Sabinin's book on plant physiology was abruptly withdrawn from publication in 1948. He died by suicide in 1951.

Those who supported Lysenkoism were favored. Alexander Oparin vigorously defended Lysenkoism and was politically favored, although he may have been genuine in his belief, as he continued to defend it even in 1955, after its fall.

Lysenkoism became entrenched not just in academia but in Soviet schools, displacing Darwinism from natural sciences curricula.

Inspired by the success of Lysenkoism and the 1948 VASKhNIL session, other fields of Soviet science experienced brief revolutions, albeit with less success: against "Pavlovians" in medicine, against "reactionary Einsteinism" in physics and quantum mechanics, and against Pauling resonance theory in chemistry.

In addition to the biological sciences, Lysenkoism had an impact on geological sciences, especially paleontology and biostratigraphy in the USSR.

=== Fall ===
At the end of 1952, the situation started to change, and newspapers published articles criticizing Lysenkoism. However, the return to regular genetics slowed down in Nikita Khrushchev's time, when Lysenko showed him the supposed successes of an experimental agricultural complex. It was once again forbidden to criticize Lysenkoism, though it was now possible to express different views, and the geneticists imprisoned under Stalin were released or rehabilitated posthumously. The ban was finally lifted in the mid-1960s.

Lysenkoism was never dominant in the West, and during the 1960s, it increasingly was seen as pseudoscience. Soviet scientists noticed the great advance in molecular biology, such as the characterization of DNA, and even hold-out Lysenkoists were starting to accept DNA as the material basis for heredity (though they still rejected gene theory).

=== Reappearance ===
In the 21st century, Lysenkoism is again being discussed in Russia, including in respectable newspapers like Kultura and by biologists. The geneticist Lev Zhivotovsky has made the unsupported claim that Lysenko helped found modern developmental biology. Discoveries in the field of epigenetics are sometimes raised as alleged late confirmation of Lysenko's theories, but in spite of the apparent high-level similarity (heritable traits passed on without DNA alteration), Lysenko believed that environment-induced changes are the primary mechanism of heritability. Heritable epigenetic effects have been found, but are minor and unstable compared to genetic inheritance.

== In other countries ==
Other countries of the Eastern Bloc accepted Lysenkoism as the official "new biology", to varying degrees.

=== Poland ===
In Communist Poland, Lysenkoism was aggressively pushed by state propaganda, signalling the newly founded Polish state's loyalty to the Soviet Union. State newspapers attacked "damage caused by bourgeois Mendelism-Morganism" and "imperialist genetics", comparing it to Mein Kampf. For example, Trybuna Ludu published an article titled "French scientists recognize superiority of Soviet science" by Pierre Daix, repeating Soviet propaganda claims. According to Aleksandra Putrament, doctoral students in biology had to study Engels's Anti-Dühring and Lenin's Materialism and Empiriocriticism and take examinations pertaining to Marxist philosophy. While some academics accepted Lysenkoism for political reasons, Polish scientists largely opposed it. A notable opponent was Wacław Gajewski: in retaliation, he was denied contact with students, though not dismissed from the Warsaw botanical garden. Lysenkoism was rejected from 1956, and in 1958 Gajewski founded Poland's first department of genetics, at the University of Warsaw.

=== Czechoslovakia ===
Communist Czechoslovakia adopted Lysenkoism in 1949. The prominent geneticist Jaroslav Kříženecký (1896–1964) criticized Lysenkoism in his lectures, and was dismissed from the Agricultural University in 1949 for "serving the established capitalistic system, considering himself superior to the working class, and being hostile to the democratic order of the people"; he was imprisoned in 1958.

=== East Germany ===
In East Germany, although Lysenkoism was taught at some universities, it had very little impact on science due to the actions of a few scientists, such as the geneticist Hans Stubbe, and scientific contact with West Berlin research institutions. Nonetheless, Lysenkoist theories were found in schoolbooks as late as the dismissal of Nikita Khrushchev in 1964.

=== China ===
Lysenkoism dominated Chinese science from 1949 until 1956, during which open discussion of alternative theories like classical Mendelian genetics was forbidden. Only in 1956 during a genetics symposium opponents of Lysenkoism were permitted to freely criticize it and argue for Mendelian genetics. In the proceedings from the symposium, Tan Jiazhen is quoted as saying "Since [the] USSR started to criticize Lysenko, we have dared to criticize him too". For a while, both schools were permitted to coexist, although the influence of the Lysenkoists remained strong for several years, contributing to the Great Famine through loss of yields.

=== North Vietnam ===
Lysenkoist theories and practices were attempted in North Vietnam, often in conjunction with the pedological theories of Vasili Williams as part of a broader diffusion of Soviet agronomy.

=== Non-communist countries ===
Almost alone among Western scientists, John Desmond Bernal, Professor of Physics at Birkbeck College, London, a Fellow of the Royal Society, and a communist, made an aggressive public defence of Lysenko. Australian biochemist and fellow communist Jack Legge tried to find a middle ground between Lysenkoism and conventional genetics by using Lysenkoist ideas to explain phenomena which conventional genetics at the time could not satisfactorily explain, while teaching other communists about conventional genetics.

== See also ==
- Bibliography of science and technology in Russia and the Soviet Union
- Anti-intellectualism
- Deutsche Physik
- Four Pests campaign
- Junk science
- Neo-Lamarckism
- Not in Our Genes
- Solomon Levit – a notable victim
- Pavlovian session
- Politicization of science
- Suppressed research in the Soviet Union
- "Bourgeois pseudoscience"
- Nature versus nurture controversy
