= Olga Lepeshinskaya =

Olga Lepeshinskaya may refer to:

- Olga Lepeshinskaya (biologist) (1871–1963), Soviet biologist
- Olga Lepeshinskaya (dancer) (1916–2008), Soviet ballerina
