= Grigory Levitsky =

Soviet Ukrainian plant cytogeneticist

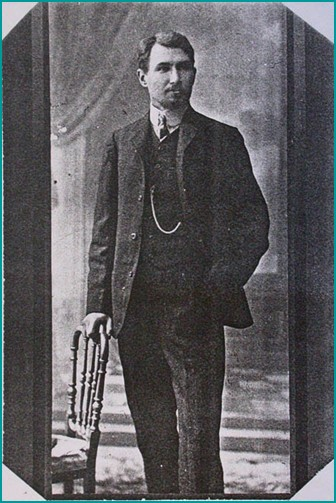
Grigory Levitsky in 1910

Grigory Andreyevich Levitsky (19 November 1878 – 20 May 1942) was a Ukrainian and Soviet plant cytogeneticist. He worked along with Nikolai Vavilov who examined the role of mitochondria in plant heredity while also studying polyploidy and mutations. He introduced the term karyotype as used in its current sense, the phenotypic characterization of the set of diploid somatic chromosomes. He was subjected to imprisonment following a clash with T.D. Lysenko under Stalin's rule, and died in prison under unknown circumstances.

== Biography ==
Levitsky was born in Bilky, Ukraine, where his father was a priest in the Russian Orthodox church. Educated in Kyiv, he went to the University of St. Vladimir where he became a student of S.G. Navashin and N.V. Tsinger. He graduated in 1902 and worked as a botanical assistant at the Kyiv Polytechnic Institute. In 1907 he was arrested for his involvement in politics and in the peasant movement. After release from Butyrka prison, he was exiled for four years. He travelled through Europe and studied cell biology at libraries in Paris and London and worked for a year in 1909 at the marine biological station in Villefranche followed by a stint in Bonn under Eduard Strasburger (1844–1912). He studied mitochondria (then called chondriosomes) and returned to Kyiv in 1911 to continue studies at the Kyiv Polytechnic Institute. In 1914 he was mobilized for World War I but demobilized in 1915 to return to his studies. He received his master's degree and became a privatdozent. In 1920 he was dismissed from the Polytechnic Institute, accused of being a Ukrainian nationalist. He then worked on sugar beet at the Sugar Trust where he continued his studies on genetics for plant breeding. He travelled briefly and met Nikolai Vavilov who helped him with the latest literature from Leningrad in 1922. He returned to Kyiv and began to work on a book, The Material Basis of Heredity, which was published in 1924. Vavilov invited Levitsky to establish a cytology laboratory at the All-Union Institute of Plant Industry that he directed from 1925. Levitsky considered evolution by polyploidy, examined mutation induction and hybridization and became known as the leading plant cytogeneticist. In 1933 Levitsky was arrested by Stalin's agents and asked him to confess that he was a terrorist. After he refused, he was sent into exile but in 1934 Vavilov, H. J. Muller and others influenced a pardon and he was allowed to return to Detskoe Selo. He joined the department of plant genetics at Leningrad University as a professor. The next year, Levitsky clashed with I.I. Prezent, a follower of T.D. Lysenko. In 1938, Lysenko rose to power and on 28 June 1941 Levitsky was arrested and vanished. Following World War II, his name was included as a winner of the Order of the Red Banner of Labour. His wife assumed that this meant he was alive and went to make enquiries. The authorities arrested her along with her daughter. The daughter survived but his wife died. The award was apparently a bureaucratic error. In 1956 his daughter petitioned the government and all charges against her father were dropped and he was formally rehabilitated. It is thought that he died in prison in Zlatousk on 20 May 1942.
