= Dmitry Sabinin =

Soviet botanist, plant physiologist

Dmitry Anatolyevich Sabinin
- Born: 17 November (29), 1889; Saint Petersburg, The Russian Empire
- Died: 22 April 1951 (age 61); Golubaya Bukhta, near Gelendzhik, Krasnodar Territory, The USSR the Russian Soviet Federative Socialist Republic (1918–1925).svg RSFSR (1917–1922), USSR
- Known for: Criticism of the works of T. D. Lysenko
- Awards: K. A. Timiryazev Prize

Academic background
- Education: Doctor of Biological Sciences (1935)
- Alma mater: Saint Petersburg University (1913)
- Academic advisors: V. I. Palladin, A. A. Richter

Academic work
- Discipline: Botany, Plant Physiology
- Institutions: Perm University, Research Institute of Cotton Growing in Tashkent, All-Union Institute of Fertilizers, Agrochemistry and Agrosoil Science, Moscow State University, Institute of Plant Physiology of the USSR Academy of Sciences
- Notable students: P. A. Genkel, O.A. Semikhatov

Dmitry Anatolievich Sabinin (1889–1951) was a Soviet botanist, plant physiologist, Vice-Rector (1923–1924), Head of the Department of Plant Physiology (1924–1929) of Perm University, Head of the Department of Plant Physiology of Moscow State University (1932–1948), Head of the Laboratory of the Institute of Plant Physiology of the USSR Academy of Sciences (1938–1941).

== Biography ==
Born on 17 November (29), 1889 in St. Petersburg.

In 1913, he graduated from Imperial Saint Petersburg University.

In 1918, he was invited to Perm University as a senior assistant at the Department of Plant Physiology. Participated in the creation of a plant physiology laboratory, in the work of the Kama Biological Station, and the Biological Research Institute at Perm University. In 1923, he received the title of professor and a year later was appointed head of the department of plant physiology.

From February 1923 to 17 December 1924, he worked as Vice-Rector (head of the scientific and educational department) of Perm University.

As of 1929, he was head of the laboratory of the Research Institute of Cotton Growing in Tashkent, and since 1932, he was head of the laboratory of the All-Union Institute of Fertilizers, Agrochemistry, and Agrosoil Science.

From 1932 to 1948, he was a professor and head of the Plant Physiology department at Moscow State University. While teaching at Moscow State University for over ten years, he openly criticized Lysenkoism / the teachings of T. D. Lysenko.

From 1938 to 1941, he was head of the laboratory of Institute of Plant Physiology of the USSR Academy of Sciences.

In 1948, he was appointed director of The Botanical Garden of Moscow State University. After the August session of the All-Russian Academy of Agricultural Sciences in 1948, which ushered in the era of the official recognition of Lysenkoism, he was relieved of his position as head of the botanical garden and the department of plant physiology of the biological faculty by order of the Minister of Higher Education of the USSR No. 1208 of 23 August 1948, "for the fight against the Michurinists" (a Stalin-era euphemism, it meant he dared to criticize T.D. Lysenko, who was a Stalin protégé).

From 1949 to 1951, he headed the Black Sea Station of the Institute of Oceanology of the USSR Academy of Sciences.

He committed suicide in 1951 in Golubaya Bukhta near Gelendzhik (he shot himself).

Daughter Marina (1917–2000) was a musicologist.

== Scientific activity ==
One of the most important phytophysiologists of the 20th century, D.A. Sabinin was the first among biologists back in the early 1940s who understood the enormous role of nucleic acids in plant ontogeny. His classic works on mineral nutrition, in which he substantiated the specific role of the root not only as a passive organ that absorbs water and minerals but also as the most important biochemical laboratory of the plant, were important stages in the development of plant physiology as a science. In 1945, for the monograph "Mineral Nutrition of Plants" (1940), he was awarded the Presidium of the Academy of Sciences of the USSR. K. A. Timiryazev.

D. A. Sabinin brought up a galaxy of students who played a huge role in the post-war development of plant physiology in the USSR: M. A. Ali-Zade, S. S. Andreenko, T. F. Andreeva, S. S. Baslavskaya, A. K. Belousova, P. A. Genkel, V. N. Zholkevich, M. G. Zaitseva, I. I. Kolosov, L. I. Krasovsky, B. G. Minina, N. G. Potapov, Yu. A. Samygin, O. A. Semikhatova, M. B. Shternberg, N. Z. Stankov, O. M. Trubetskova, A. F. Kleshnin, N. K. Tilgor, O. F. Tueva, Yu. L. Tselniker, V. V. Tserling, and many others.

== Main works ==
- Mineral nutrition of plants. Moscow, 1940;
- Physiological bases of plant nutrition. Moscow, 1955;
- Physiology of plant development. Moscow., 963;
- Selected works on the mineral nutrition of plants. Moscow.,1971.

== Memory ==
He was buried on the territory of the Southern Branch (in the past – the Black Sea Station) of the Institute of Oceanology in Golubaya Bukhta.

In 1989, taking into account the importance of D. A. Sabinin in the restoration and development of domestic biology, his fruitful pedagogical activity as a professor at Moscow University, the Academic Council of the Faculty of Biology, on the 100th anniversary of his birth, established an annual award for the faculty members for the best work on biology, awarded to researchers or research teams.

In 2005, the Crimean Astrophysical Observatory named the newly discovered minor planet (registered in the international catalog under number 6591) "Sabinin" in honor of Dmitry Anatolyevich Sabinin.

In honor of Dmitry Anatolyevich, the plant genus Sabinia (2018) [= Caroxylon Thunb.].
