= Wacław Gajewski =

Polish biologist (1911–1997)

- Born: 28 February 1911; Kraków, Poland
- Died: 12 December 1997 (aged 86); Warsaw, Poland
- Education: University of Warsaw
- Known for: Work on Geum and fungal genetics; establishment of Polish genetics
- Scientific career
- Fields: Genetics

Wacław Gajewski (Polish pronunciation: [vat͡s.waf ɡaˈjɛf.ski]; 28 February 1911 – 12 December 1997) was a Polish geneticist, one of the founders of the Polish post-war genetics and author of academic and popular scientific books.

== Biography ==
Gajewski was born in Kraków in 1911. He graduated from the Warsaw University in 1934 and received his doctorate in 1937.

Shortly after the war, in 1948 Gajewski was one of the few Polish biologists who opposed the official "new biology", lysenkoism—a pseudoscientific theory of genetics proposed by the Soviet agronomist Trofim Lysenko. Consequently, during the Stalinist period Gajewski was not allowed any contact with students; however, he was permitted to continue his scientific work. In 1950 he was elected a member of the Polish Academy of Arts and Sciences.

In 1956, with the Gomułka Thaw and the diminishing importance of lysenkoism, Gajewski was allowed to hold a position of lecturer at the University of Warsaw, where two years later, the first Polish department of genetics was established under his leadership.

During the years 1967-1981 Gajewski was the director of the Institute of Biochemistry and Biophysics of the Polish Academy of Sciences. In 1981, when martial law was imposed in Poland, Gajewski (then retired) was initially on the list of Polish scientists who were to be arrested.

He died in Warsaw in 1997.

== Scientific career ==
Gajewski first published in 1932. He soon became interested in cytogenetics and molecular genetics.

In the late 1940s and early 1950s, Gajewski worked on the genetics of the genus Geum. Later, he published several acknowledged papers in the area of fungal genetics.
