= Isaak Prezent =

Soviet philosopher of biology (1902–1969)

- Born: Isaak Izrailevich Prezent; 28 September 1902; Toropets, Pskov Governorate, Russian Empire
- Died: 6 January 1969 (aged 66); Moscow, Soviet Union
- Citizenship: USSR
- Education: Leningrad State University
- Known for: Lysenkoism
- Awards: Order of the Red Banner of Labour
- Scientific career
- Fields: Biology, philosophy of science
- Workplaces: Leningrad State University; Moscow State University; Lenin All-Union Academy of Agricultural Sciences; Herzen University

Isaak (Isay) Izrailevich Prezent (Russian: Исаа́к (Исай) Изра́илевич Презе́нт; 27 September [O.S. 15 September] 1902 – 6 January 1969) was a Soviet philosopher of biology, best known for his work on Marxist methodology of science and as one of the key figures of Lysenkoism.

== Early life and education ==
Prezent was born in 1902 in the town of Toropets in a Jewish family. His father owned a shop in Zapadnaya Dvina.

Prezent went to high school in Dukhovshschina, and after completing it in 1919, he returned to Zapadnaya Dvina to teach in a local railway school. He became a communist activist while still in high school. Parallel with being a teacher in Zapadnaya Dvina, he helped found a local branch of Komsomol, and was finally accepted as a party member in 1921. Later that year he moved to Pskov to assume a gubernatorial-level party function. Following a party decision, he enrolled at Leningrad State University (LGU) in 1922. He temporarily left university in 1923 to take part in the late stages of the Civil War as a political instructor. He soon resumed his studies, and graduated from Faculty of Social Sciences of LGU in 1926. As a recognition for his work on biology, he was awarded a doctorate in biological sciences in 1936.

== Career ==
After graduating, Prezent worked on achieving transition from social sciences to biology by acquainting himself to some of the lead Soviet biologists of the time, including geneticist Nikolai Vavilov. Prezent even briefly worked for Vavilov at the Institute of Plant Industry. However, the two would later become major adversaries, once Prezent joined Lysenko and denounced genetics.

After leaving Vavilov, Prezent started teaching at Herzen Pedagogical Institute, where he quickly rose through the academic ranks and became a docent within a couple of years. At the same time, he was active in the Scientific Society of Marxists (NOM, initialism for Nauchno obshchestvo marksistov). There he co-headed the group focused on biology. In 1930, NOM was merged into the Communist Academy, and in that or following year Prezent assumed a position of the head of biology sector of the natural science section of the Leningrad branch of Communist Academy. In 1931, he started teaching dialectics of nature and evolutionary studies at LGU, parallel with his activities in the Communist Academy. In this early part of his career, Prezent was mostly focused on ecology.

However, from 1932 on, many of the academic Marxist societies were shut down, after the proponents of "cultural revolution" fell out of favor with the regime. In 1934, Prezent had to leave university, and he moved to Odesa, where he worked with Trofim Lysenko at All-Union Institute of Selection and Genetics until 1938. The alliance with Lysenko proved extremely useful for both men, as Lysenko got a politically savvy mentor in Prezent, while Prezent managed to return to political grace by associating himself with Lysenko and changing his views on biology and genetics in the process. From 1935 to 1941, Prezent was a deputy editor-in-chief of journal Yarovizaciya (Russian: Яровизация, meaning Vernalization). In 1939, he became Lysenko's consultant for philosophical issues at Lenin All-Union Academy of Agricultural Science (VASKhNIL) in Moscow, where he became a full member in 1948. From 1943 until 1951, Prezent held a chair of Darwinism and History of Biology at LGU, while for the final three years of that period (1948-1951) simultaneously being the dean of the Faculty of Biology of Moscow State University (MGU).

In 1951, Prezent was made to leave both university positions due to concerns about his capacity to teach biology. He returned to VASKhNIL, where he stayed until the beginning of 1969, when he was dismissed due to his association with Lysenkoism.

== Attacks on ecology ==
During the early 1930s, Prezent established himself as a critic of the leading Soviet ecologists of the time, and especially of the sub-field of biocenology as such. His attack on biocenologists had three directions: attack on the botanically-oriented ecologists, attack on then-most prominent Soviet educator in the field Boris Yevgenyevich Raikov, and finally attack on zoology-focused ecologists.

Prezent's attack on plant ecologists occurred in February 1931. As a representative of Leningrad branch of Communist Academy, he had a role in the organization of the First All-Union Conference of Geobotanists and Floristics Experts. The conference was sponsored by the Botanical Institute, but Prezent nonetheless managed to overtake "methodological leadership" and put forward his agenda against biocenological botanists.

Boris Raikov was Prezent's former colleague from Herzen Institute, and as of 1930 he was already under attacks from the organization of young naturalists. Prezent objected to Raikov's conservationist views. He considered conservationism a "wrecking theory", holding that it opposed the Stalinist views on progress, understood here as a triumph of working men and their technology. Proponents of conservationism, such as Raikov, were therefore considered by Prezent to be "agents of the world bourgeoisie". In 1932, one of the Prezent's anti-Raikov speeches, titled Class Struggle on the Natural Science Front was published in 20,000 copies, which marked the demise of conservationism in ecological education. Raikov and his associates were arrested or exiled. Raikov himself spent the World War II teaching in Arkhangelsk.

The attack on zoologists started early, during the Fourth All-Union Congress of Zoologists, Anatomists, and Histologists in Kiev in May 1930, where Prezent first made his criticism of biocenology public in an exchange with the prominent zoologist Vladimir Vladimirovich Stanchinskiy. Similarly to the tactics he employed in fighting the botanists, Prezent waited until the December 1931 All-Union Faunistics Conference, and navigated its organization into silencing and attacking conservationism.

== Prezent's cooperation with Lysenko ==
Prezent first met Lysenko at the Congress of Geneticists and Breeders in 1929, but it was not until 1934 that they started closely cooperating in Lysenko's lab in Odesa. By that time, Lysenko was already following Michurin's version of Lamarckism, but he was not yet associating his work in the field of genetics with any political positions. However, after 1934, Prezent began introducing Lysenko to Marxist theory and party politics, which led to increasingly political tone of Lysenko's pronouncements, as well as to both Lysenko and Prezent denouncing Mendelian genetics. Prezent's influence on Lysenko was not limited to the philosophical and political aspects of the latter's work. Despite Prezent's lack of formal education in biology, he was one of Lysenko's main sources of information on Darwinism.

Lysenko eventually produced a pseudo-scientific synthesis of Michurin's evolutionary biology, Prezent's philosophy of science, and Stalinist political theory that came to be known as Lysenkoism. Lysenko's teachings were based on his concept of "natural cooperation", as opposed to Darwin's idea of natural selection that he rejected. According to Lysenko, not only were the acquired characteristics of organisms inheritable, but it was even possible for organisms of one species to transform into another species by acquiring appropriate characteristics over the course of their lives. The proponents of Lysenkoism advocated for the use of these "findings" in agriculture in order to increase yields, and alleviate the consequences of the Soviet famine of 1930–1933.

While many of Lysenko's views on agriculture, as well as his prominence, predated his cooperation with Prezent, it was only after 1934 that his debate with the mainstream geneticists became politicized. In that period, and with the full support of Stalin, many of the Soviet geneticists were purged or at least fired. In 1935 and 1936 Lysenko and Prezent brought the debates over genetics to the center of party politics. In those two years, the so-called "Academy Sessions" took place. It was a series of scientific debates chaired by Stalin himself, where Lysenko and Prezent counterposed their views to those of mainstream geneticists. The entire time, Prezent was extremely active in presenting Lysenko's works publicly as acts of genius. The full triumph came during a conference in 1948, when Lysenko announced genetics to be a bourgeois pseudoscience, and that the Central Committee supported such stance. After this, any serious engagement with non-Lysenkoist genetics became impossible in the Soviet Union until 1964, especially at Lysenko-headed VASKhNIL, and Prezent-headed MGU Department of Darwinism.

== Death ==
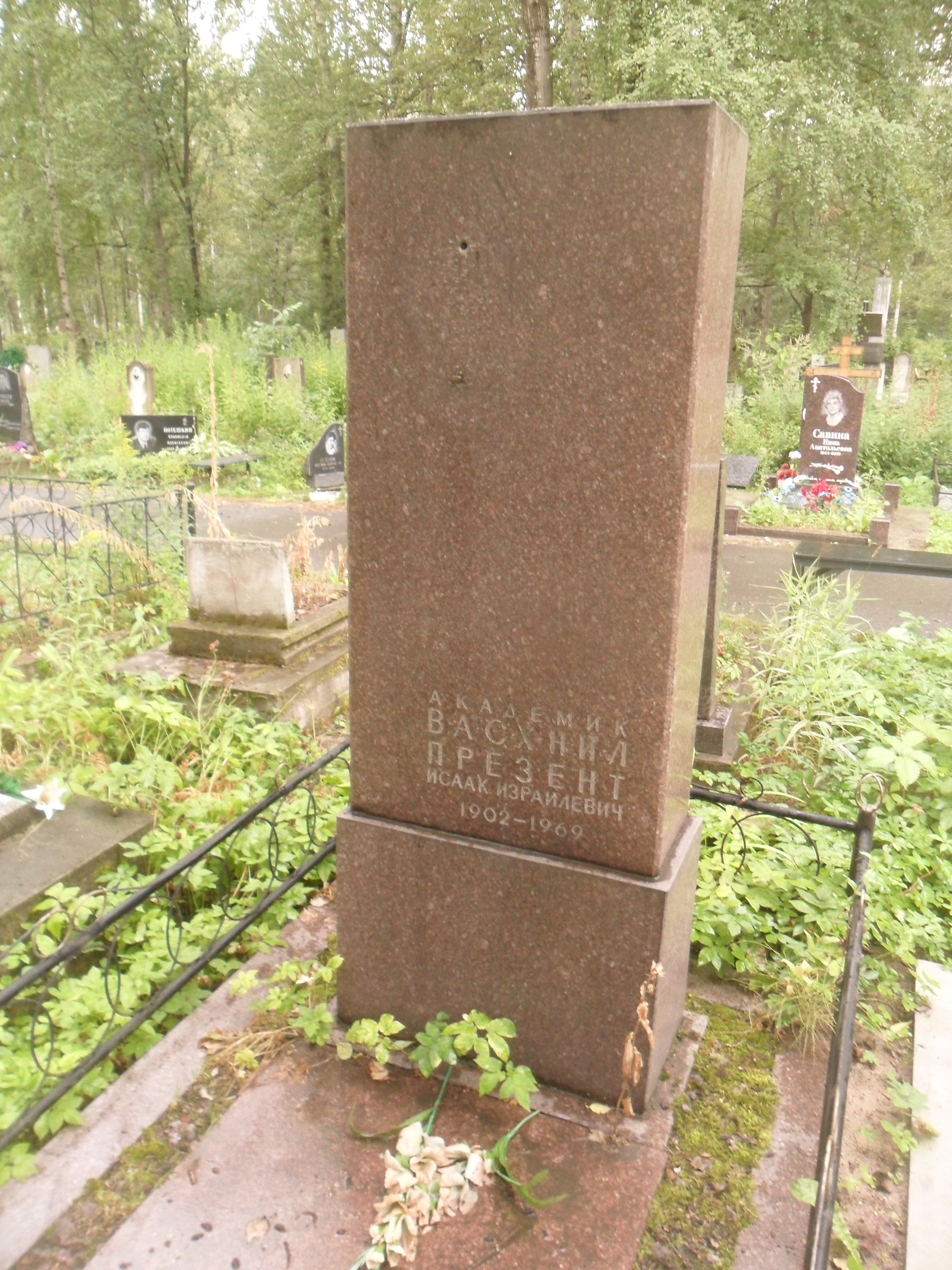
Prezent's grave at the Cemetery in Memory of the Victims of 9 January in St. Petersburg

Isaak Prezent died of cancer on 6 January 1969 in Moscow. It was only several days after being dismissed from VASKhNIL.

== Awards ==
In 1943, Prezent was awarded the Order of the Red Banner of Labour.

== Selected works ==
- The Outline of the Program of Historical Materialism (Презент И. И. Программа-конспект по историческому материализму. — Л.: Б. и., 1927. — ? с.)
- The Origin of Speech and Thought (Презент И. И. Происхождение речи и мышления. (К вопросу об их приоритете). Предисл. Б. А. Фингерта. — Л.: «Прибой», 1928. — 128 с.)
- Bahaism (Даров И. Бехаизм. (Новая религия Востока). — Л.: «Прибой», 1930. — 55 с.)
- Darwin's Theory in the World of Dialectical Materialism (Презент И. И. "Теория Дарвина в свете диалектического материализма". [Тезисы к 50-летию со дня смерти Ч. Дарвина. 1882—1932]. — Л.: Леногиз-Ленмедиздат, 1932. — 32 с.)
- Class Struggle on the Front of Science (Презент И. И. Классовая борьба на естественно-научном фронте. Обработанная стенограмма доклада на Конференции педагогов-естественников г. Ленинграда. — М.-Л.: Огиз-Учпедгиз, 1932. — 72 с.)
- Selection and the Theory of the Stages of Plant Development (Лысенко Т. Д., Презент И. И. Селекция и теория стадийного развития растения. — М.: Сельхозгиз, 1935. — 64 с.)
- The Great Innovator Trofim Denisovich Lysenko (Презент И. И. Замечательный новатор Трофим Денисович Лысенко. — Р.-н/Д: Ростиздат, 1939. — 28 с.)
- The Reserves of Potato Tuber (Презент И. И. Резервы картофельного клубня. — М.: Пищепромиздат, 1943. — 15 с.)
- In Cooperation with Nature. I.V. Michurin and His Teachings (Презент И. И. В содружестве с природой. И. В. Мичурин и его учение. — Л.: Лениздат, 1946. — 132 с.)
- The Great Transformator of Nature I.V. Michurin (Презент И. И. Великий преобразователь природы И. В. Мичурин. — М.-Л.: Детгиз, 1949. — 63 с.)
- I.V. Michurin - The Founder of Soviet Creative Darwinism (Презент И. И. И. В. Мичурин — основоположник советского творческого дарвинизма. [Стенограмма доклада, посвящённого 15-летию со дня смерти И. В. Мичурина]. — М.: «Правда», 1951. — 24 с.)
- J.-B. Lamarck - A Materialist Biologist (Презент И. И. Биолог-материалист Ж. Б. Ламарк. — М.: Изд-во АН СССР, 1960. — 59 с.)
- I.V. Michurin and His Teachings (Презент И. И. И. В. Мичурин и его учение. — М.: Изд-во АН СССР, 1961. — 198 с.)

== See also ==
- Eco-socialism#1880s–1930s – Marx, Morris and influence on the Russian Revolution
- Japhetic theory
- Suppressed research in the Soviet Union
- Politicization of science
- List of topics characterized as pseudoscience
- Agricultural science
