= Solomon Levit =

Soviet physician and eugenicist (1894–1938)

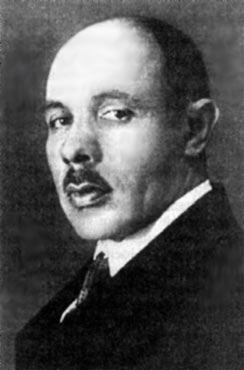

Solomon Grigorievich Levit (Russian: Соломон Григорьевич Левит; 6 July 1894 – 29 May 1938) was a Soviet physician, and human geneticist who was executed during the Great Purge along with other geneticists who opposed Trofim Lysenko.

Solomon Levit was born as Shliom Girshevich Levit to a Jewish family in Vilkomir (now Ukmerge) and was the only son to be educated. He went to the local gymnasium and then moved to Petrograd, initially studying law and then studied medicine. He served in the medical corps during the 1918 Civil War. After receiving a medical degree in 1921 he went to work in the Moscow University Clinic.

He took an interest in blood-related diseases and published a monograph on hemorrhagic diathesis in 1929. Levit also rose to hold various positions in the Communist Party. He trained in 1927 under Alexander Sergeevich Serebrovsky and was strongly opposed to Lamarckism which was still in fashion. He left work in the clinic to move to the Narkomzdrav Biomedical Institute in 1928. In 1930 he became the head of the Genetics Division of the Institute and in the same year, he was nominated by the Government along with Izrail Agol to train in the United States under H.J. Muller. Muller, along with Agol and Levit, took an interest in positive eugenics and included a chapter on the idea in his book Out of the Night (1935) and sent a copy of it to Stalin.

By the time he returned to the Soviet Union in 1932 his post had been abolished but he was made a director of a newly created Maxim Gorky Biomedical Research Institute. Levit was publicly opposed to Nazi ideas on eugenics and racism. In 1935 the institute was renamed to the Maxim Gorky Research Institute of Medical Genetics and they had begun work among others on 234 twins. There had also been a proposal for positive eugenics with human artificial insemination under Alexander Serebrovsky.

The communist party met in November 1936 and denounced Levit and Agol as promoters of fascist ideas. At the international meeting of geneticists in Moscow, Muller was an invited speaker and there was considerable debate on eugenics. This was utilized by Trofim Lysenko to demonstrate that his opponents who had been trained in genetics were fascists. Muller, who stayed on early in 1937, later faced the threat of being arrested but escaped.

Shortly after his exit, Izrail Agol was arrested and executed while Levit was removed from his position as a director and arrested on 11 January 1938. He was declared an American spy and executed in Lubyanka prison in May that year.
