= Gustav Gassner =

German botanist and plant pathologist (1881–1955)

- Born: 17 January 1881; Berlin, Germany
- Died: 5 February 1955 (aged 74); Lüneburg
- Occupations: botanist and plant pathologist

Gustav Gassner (born 17 January 1881 in Berlin; died 5 February 1955 in Lüneburg) was a German botanist and plant pathologist whose 1918 paper on vernalization has been called "the first systematic study of temperature as a factor in the developmental physiology of plants."

His wide-ranging research interests in phytopathology and plant physiology included work on photosynthesis and plant nutrition as well as practical work on plant diseases such as rust and smut.

His classic text from 1931 Mikroskopische Untersuchung pflanzlicher Lebensmittel und Futtermittel ("Microscopic examination of plant foods and beverages") is still in use in German universities and is still referred to by German students as "Gassner."

== Personal life ==
In 1910 he returned to Germany from Montevideo, Uruguay and married Lili Fassier-Farnell, with whom he had four sons and a daughter.

== Scientific career ==
Gassner, the son of emigrants from Salzburg, attended the Friedrichs-Gymnasium in Berlin and then studied botany and natural sciences, in Halle and Berlin, from 1899 to 1905, getting his PhD in 1906 from the Agricultural University of Berlin. In 1907 he became professor of botany and plant pathology at the Agricultural University of Montevideo, Uruguay.

During World War I, he directed a German Army laboratory. In 1918 he was appointed to the Chair of Botany at the Technical University of Braunschweig, where he also directed the Botanical Institute and the Botanical Gardens.

Although he considered himself a patriotic German, he was dismissed from his rectorship and imprisoned for 11 days in 1932 after taking such anti-Nazi actions as prohibiting the Hitler salute and forbidding any political activity within the Institute of Technology in Braunschweig. In September 1933 he was also dismissed as professor of botany; he emigrated to Turkey in 1934. After spending five years working in Turkey, he returned to Germany in 1939 to become head of the Research Institute for Plant Conservation and Biology in Magdeburg. In 1945, he was appointed rector and professor at the Technical University of Braunschweig, from which he retired in 1951.

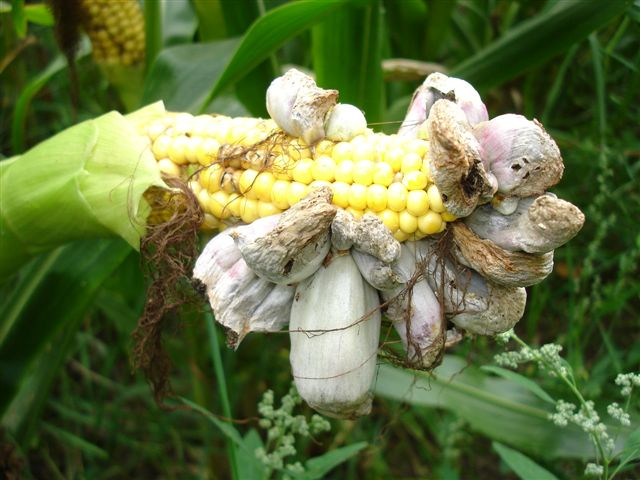
Corn infected with smut, a plant fungus that Gassner studied.

Gassner's 1918 paper on the effect of lowered temperature on the development of winter rye inspired many followers; by the 1930s work on vernalization was being described as "trendy" (Modeforschung). His wide-ranging research interests in phytopathology and plant physiology included work on photosynthesis and plant nutrition as well as practical work on plant diseases such as rust and smut. He also researched the use of chemical pesticides to protect germinating plants, such as treating seeds with organic mercury compounds. In his lifetime, he received many honors including, in 1952, Germany's Grand Cross of Merit.

== Writings ==
- Gassner, Gustav: "Beiträge zur physiologischen Charakteristik sommer und winteranueller Gewächse insbesondere der Getreidepflanzen," Zeitschr. Botanik Berlin 1918.
- Mikroskopische Untersuchung pflanzlicher Lebensmittel und Futtermittel : der Gassner. ISBN 3-89947-256-X.
