= Izrail Agol =

Soviet geneticist and philosopher (1891–1937)

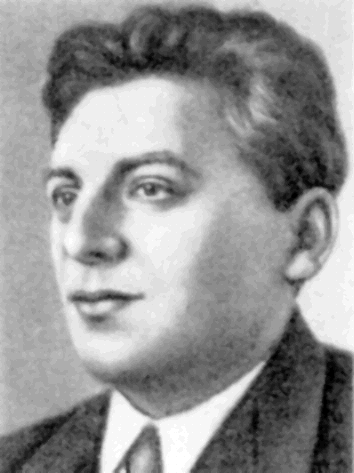
Izrail Agol

Izrail Iossofovich Agol (Russian: Изра́иль Ио́сифович Аго́л; Belarusian: Ізра́іль Іо́сіфавіч Аго́л; Yiddish: ישׂראל אַגאָל; November 20, 1891 – March 8, 1937) was a Soviet geneticist and philosopher. He was a member of the USSR Academy of Science, worked briefly in the United States of America, and took an interest in radiation induced mutagenesis. As a Marxist philosopher, he also studied vitalist and mechanist views in biology and their relation to Marxism. He was killed in the aftermath of Trofim Lysenko's rise in the Stalin regime.

== Education and revolutionary activities ==
Agol was born in Babruysk, Belarus to a poor Jewish family. He graduated from high school in Vilna. He was drafted during World War I and was part of a local self-defence group against a pogrom in which a friend and his first love were shot dead.

Agol took part in the October Revolution, becoming a member of the Bolshevik wing of the Russian Social-Democratic Labour Party ("RSDLP(b)") in October 1917. In 1919 he was a member of the Central Executive Committee of the RSDLP(b) of Belarus while fighting in the Civil War from 1919 to 1921.

In 1920 he lived for a time in the Kremlin, where his wife worked in Vladimir Lenin's office. Beginning in 1921, he worked in the editorial offices of the newspapers Pravda and Trud.

== Academic career ==
At this same time he studied at the medical faculty of Moscow State University, conducting research there under A.S. Serebrovsky and graduating from it in 1923. After graduation he worked as a psychiatrist.

He joined the Institute of Red Professors in 1925 and graduated from the institute in 1928. From 1926 he worked at the Moscow Zootechnical Institute and from 1928 he headed the Biological Institute named after Kliment Timiryazev of the Communist Academy. He received a Rockefeller Scholarship to study genetics under Hermann Joseph Muller at the University of Texas from 1930 to 1932 along with Solomon Levit.

== Downfall and rehabilitation ==
Agol and Levit returned to the Soviet Union and found themselves in opposition to Trofim Lysenko. Agol was arrested on May 27, 1936 on charges of sabotage.

The American scientist C. B. Davenport addressed a letter to the US Secretary of State in December 1936 concerning the arrest of Agol, Nikolai Vavilov, and Levit, in which he wrote:

As a geneticist, I strongly protest against the actions of the Soviet government against my colleagues Levit, Agol and Vavilov. These scientists own research of the highest level, and it is thanks to their scientific activity that the world community of geneticists informs them about their achievements in genetics. The three scientists in question have significantly increased our knowledge of genetics, while bringing great benefits to the USSR.

— Legacy: documents, publications. Yu.I. Vavilov, Doctor of Physical and Mathematical Sciences.

Agol was shot as a Trotskyist on March 8, 1937. The Supreme Court of the USSR rehabilitated him on May 25, 1957.

A son, Vadim, became a molecular biologist and virologist.

== Works ==
Agol was a staunch Marxist and wrote a book on biology, vitalism and mechanistic views and their relation to Marxism [Витализм, механистический материализм и марксизм (1929)]. He also published on his experiments in mutation induction through X-rays in Drosophila. An autobiographical manuscript was published posthumously by his son.
