= VASKhNIL =

Soviet Academy of Agricultural Sciences

Lenin All-Union Academy of Agricultural Sciences
- Всесоюзная академия сельскохозяйственных наук имени В. И. Ленина
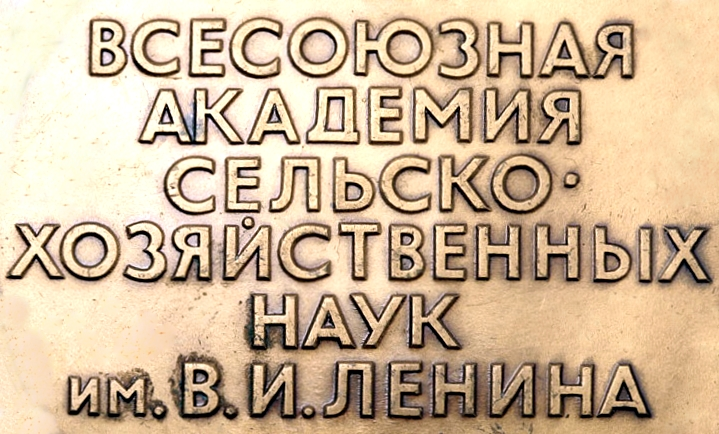
- The logo of VASKhNIL
- Other names: VASKhNIL (ВАСХНИЛ)
- Active: 1929–1992
- Affiliations: Soviet Union
- Location: Moscow

VASKhNIL (Russian: ВАСХНИЛ), the acronym for the Lenin All-Union Academy of Agricultural Sciences or the V.I. Lenin Academy of Agricultural Sciences (Всесоюзная академия сельскохозяйственных наук имени В. И. Ленина), was the Soviet Union's academy dedicated to agricultural sciences, operating from 1929 to the dissolution of the Soviet Union in 1992.

Built upon the model of the Academy of Sciences of USSR, VASKhNIL included not only a body of academicians but also a vast network of research institutions scattered all over the Union, with thousands of researchers and plant and cattle breeders.

== History ==
VASKhNIL Presidents
Period	President
1929–35	Nikolai Vavilov
1935–37	Alexander Muralov
1937–1938	Georgy Maeister
1938–56	Trofim Lysenko
1959–61	Pavel Lobanov
1961–62	Trofim Lysenko (second term)
1962–65	Mikhail Olshanskiy
1965–78	Pavel Lobanov, second term
1978–83	Petr Vavilov
1984–92	Alexander Nikonov

The academy operated from 1929 to the dissolution of the Soviet Union in 1992.

In the 1930s–40s, meetings of the academy members ('sessions' of VASKhNIL) provided the floor for debates between Lysenkoists and geneticists. After Trofim Lysenko had taken control over the academy, it became for about thirty years a stronghold of Lysenkoism. The proverbial among Russian biologists August session of VASKhNIL (31 July – 7 August 1948) organised under control of the Communist Party (Joseph Stalin personally corrected the drafts of the Lysenko's opening address "On the Situation in Biological Science") led to a formal ban on teaching "Mendelist-Weismannist-Morganist" genetics (a pejorative label based on the names of Gregor Mendel, August Weismann, and Thomas Hunt Morgan), which was effective until the early 1960s. Soviet plant breeding efforts - largely carried out by the VASKhNIL - were well funded, however not as effective as they might have been. This was partly due to this era of forced Lysenkoism.

The end of the Soviet era in 1991 brought a sudden fall in funding for plant breeding. Then on 4 February 1992, the VASKhNIL ceased to exist and was succeeded by the Russian Academy of Agricultural Sciences (Russian: Российская академия сельскохозяйственных наук, РАСН), which became a part of the Russian Academy of Sciences in 2013.

== See also ==
- Academy of Sciences of the Soviet Union
- Ministry of Agrarian Policy and Food (Ukraine)
- Science and technology in the Soviet Union
- Lysenkoism
