= Vernalization =

Induction of a plant's flowering process

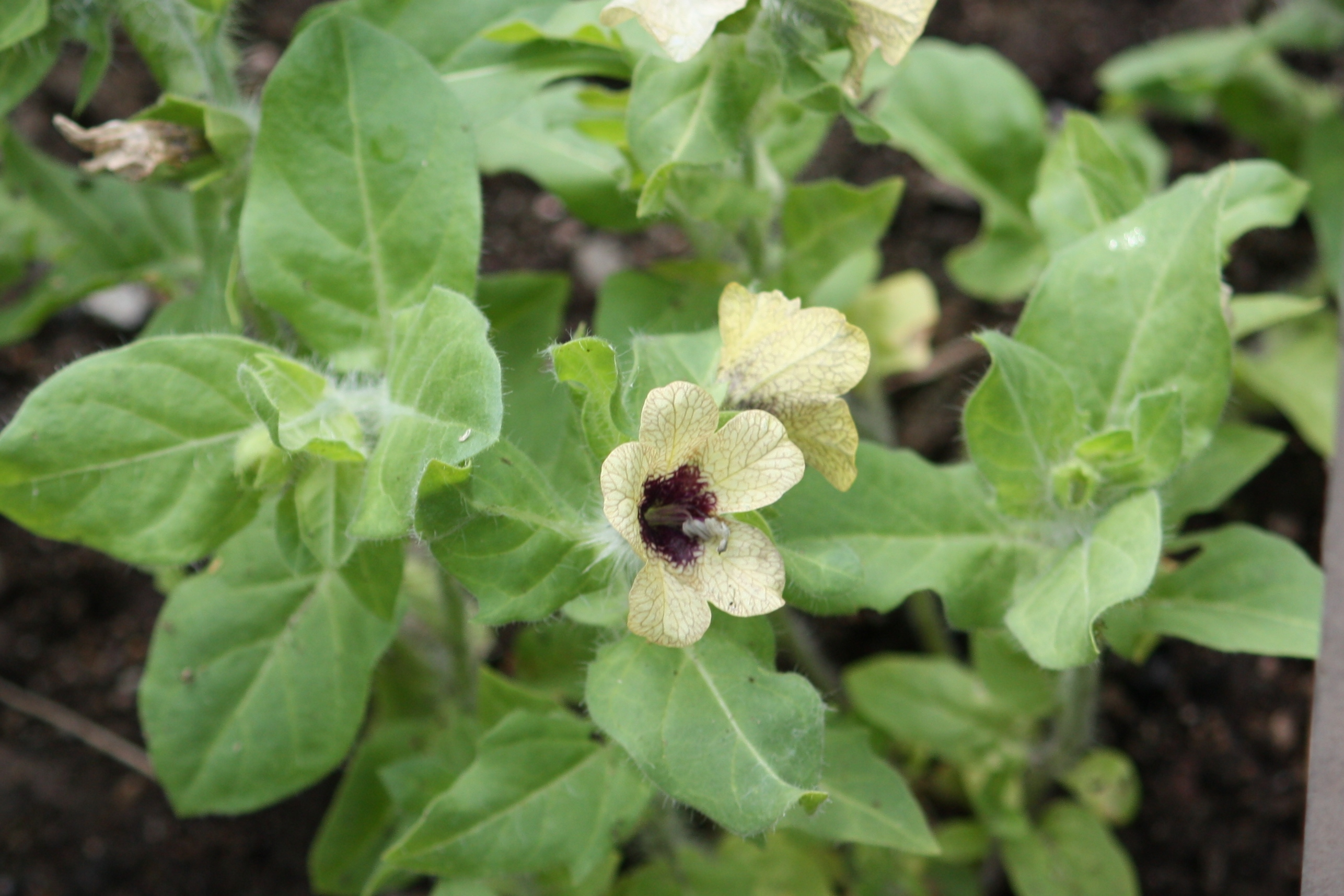
Many species of henbane require vernalization before flowering.

Vernalization (from Latin vernus 'of the spring') is the induction of a plant's flowering process by exposure to the prolonged cold of winter, or by an artificial equivalent. After vernalization, plants acquire the ability to flower, but they may require additional seasonal cues or weeks of growth before they will actually do so. The term is sometimes used to refer to the need of herbal (non-woody) plants for a period of cold dormancy in order to produce new shoots and leaves, but this usage is discouraged.

Many plants grown in temperate climates require vernalization and must experience a period of low winter temperature to initiate or accelerate the flowering process. This ensures that reproductive development and seed production occurs in spring and winters, rather than in autumn. The needed cold is often expressed in chill hours. Typical vernalization temperatures are between 1 and 7 degrees Celsius (34 and 45 degrees Fahrenheit).

For many perennial plants, such as fruit tree species, a period of cold is needed first to induce dormancy and then later, after the requisite period, re-emerge from that dormancy prior to flowering. Many monocarpic winter annuals and biennials, including some ecotypes of Arabidopsis thaliana and winter cereals such as wheat, must go through a prolonged period of cold before flowering occurs.

== History of vernalization research ==
In the history of agriculture, farmers observed a traditional distinction between "winter cereals", whose seeds require chilling (to trigger their subsequent emergence and growth), and "spring cereals", whose seeds can be sown in spring, and germinate, and then flower soon thereafter. Scientists in the early 19th century had discussed how some plants needed cold temperatures to flower. In 1857 an American agriculturist John Hancock Klippart, Secretary of the Ohio Board of Agriculture, reported the importance and effect of winter temperature on the germination of wheat. One of the most significant works was by a German plant physiologist Gustav Gassner who made a detailed discussion in his 1918 paper. Gassner was the first to systematically differentiate the specific requirements of winter plants from those of summer plants, and also that early swollen germinating seeds of winter cereals are sensitive to cold.

In 1928, the Soviet agronomist Trofim Lysenko published his works on the effects of cold on cereal seeds, and coined the term "яровизация" (yarovizatsiya : "jarovization") to describe a chilling process he used to make the seeds of winter cereals behave like spring cereals (from яровой : yarvoy, Tatar root ярый : yaryiy meaning ardent, fiery, associated with the god of spring). Lysenko himself translated the term into "vernalization" (from the Latin vernum meaning Spring). After Lysenko the term was used to explain the ability of flowering in some plants after a period of chilling due to physiological changes and external factors. The formal definition was given in 1960 by a French botanist P. Chouard, as "the acquisition or acceleration of the ability to flower by a chilling treatment."

Lysenko's 1928 paper on vernalization and plant physiology drew wide attention due to its practical consequences for Russian agriculture. Severe cold and lack of winter snow had destroyed many early winter wheat seedlings. By treating wheat seeds with moisture as well as cold, Lysenko induced them to bear a crop when planted in spring. Later however, according to Richard Amasino, Lysenko inaccurately asserted that the vernalized state could be inherited, i.e. the offspring of a vernalized plant would behave as if they themselves had also been vernalized and would not require vernalization in order to flower quickly. Opposing this view and supporting Lysenko's claim, Xiuju Li and Yongsheng Liu have detailed experimental evidence from the USSR, Hungary, Bulgaria and China that shows the conversion between spring wheat and winter wheat, positing that "it is not unreasonable to postulate epigenetic mechanisms that could plausibly result in the conversion of spring to winter wheat or vice versa."

Early research on vernalization focused on plant physiology; the increasing availability of molecular biology has made it possible to unravel its underlying mechanisms. For example, a lengthening daylight period (longer days), as well as cold temperatures are required for winter wheat plants to go from the vegetative to the reproductive state; the three interacting genes are called VRN1, VRN2, and FT (VRN3).

== In Arabidopsis thaliana ==
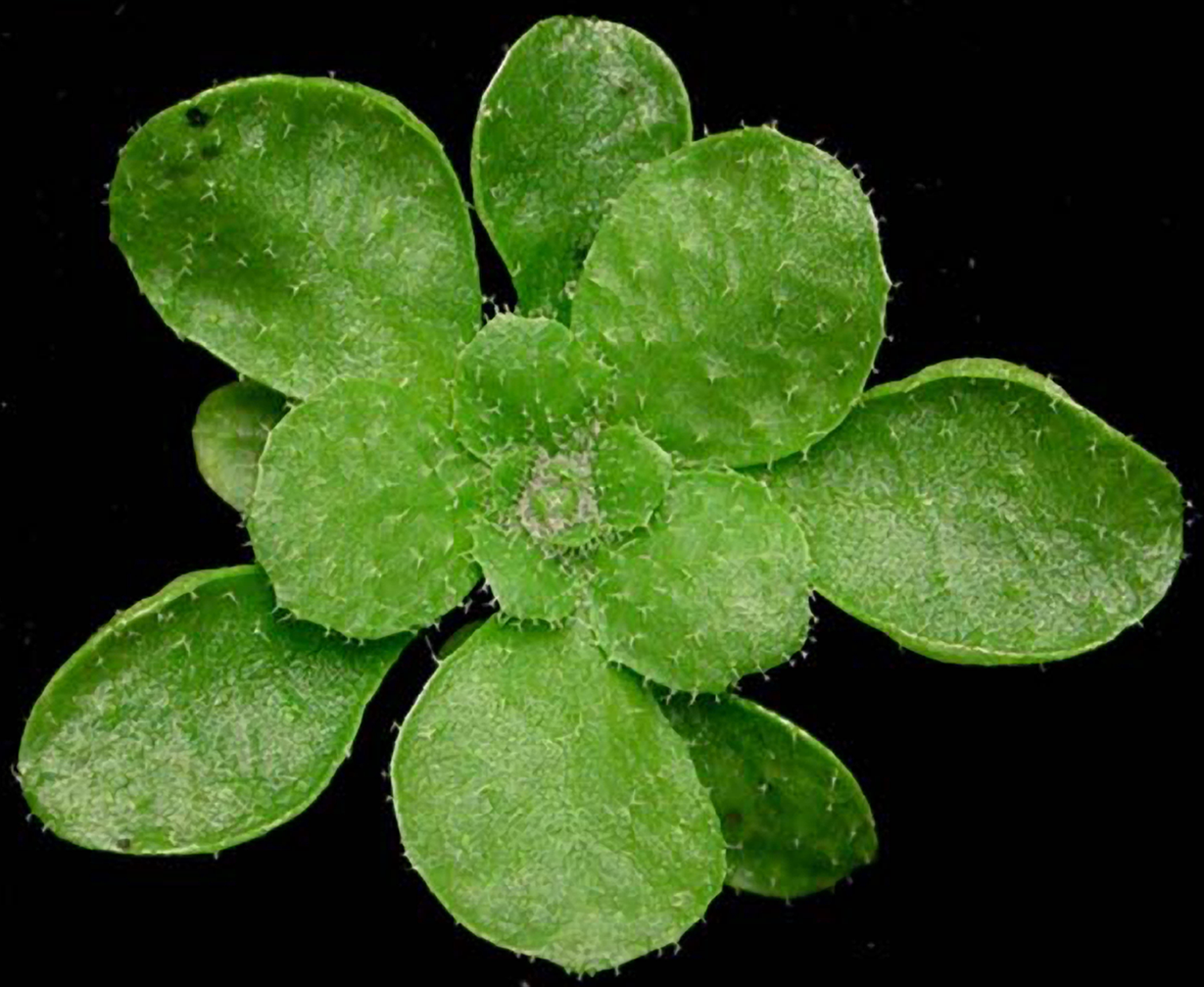
Arabidopsis thaliana rosette before vernalization, with no floral spike

Arabidopsis thaliana ("thale cress") is a much-studied model for vernalization. Some ecotypes (varieties), called "winter annuals", have delayed flowering without vernalization; others ("summer annuals") do not. The genes that underlie this difference in plant physiology have been intensively studied.

The reproductive phase change of A. thaliana occurs by a sequence of two related events: first, the bolting transition (flower stalk elongates), then the floral transition (first flower appears). Bolting is a robust predictor of flower formation, and hence a good indicator for vernalization research.

In winter annual Arabidopsis, vernalization of the meristem appears to confer competence to respond to floral inductive signals. A vernalized meristem retains competence for as long as 300 days in the absence of an inductive signal.

At the molecular level, flowering is repressed by the protein Flowering Locus C (FLC), which binds to and represses genes that promote flowering, thus blocking flowering. Winter annual ecotypes of Arabidopsis have an active copy of the gene FRIGIDA (FRI), which promotes FLC expression, thus repression of flowering. Prolonged exposure to cold (vernalization) induces expression of VERNALIZATION INSENSITIVE3, which interacts with the VERNALIZATION2 (VRN2) polycomb-like complex to reduce FLC expression through chromatin remodeling. Levels of VRN2 protein increase during long-term cold exposure as a result of inhibition of VRN2 turnover via its N-degron. The events of histone deacetylation at Lysine 9 and 14 followed by methylation at Lys 9 and 27 is associated with the vernalization response. The epigenetic silencing of FLC by chromatin remodeling is also thought to involve the cold-induced expression of antisense FLC COOLAIR or COLDAIR transcripts. Vernalization is registered by the plant by the stable silencing of individual FLC loci. The removal of silent chromatin marks at FLC during embryogenesis prevents the inheritance of the vernalized state.

Since vernalization also occurs in flc mutants (lacking FLC), vernalization must also activate a non-FLC pathway. A day-length mechanism is also important. Vernalization response works in concert with the photo-periodic genes CO, FT, PHYA, CRY2 to induce flowering.

== Epigenetic memory ==
Following the initiation of silencing, the stability of the repressed state, or epigenetic memory, is maintained through structural changes at the FLC locus. This takes the form of a repressive intragenic chromatin loop, physically linking the FLC promoter with the internal region of the first intron. COLDWRAP and COLDAIR act cooperatively to facilitate this loop by recruiting and retaining the PRC2 complex at the locus. This intragenic loop is gradually enhanced during prolonged cold exposure and serves to replace the pre-existing 5’-3’ loop associated with active transcription. By reconfiguring the physical architecture of the gene, these long non-coding RNAs (lncRNA) ensure that the PRC2-mediated silencing is stable and mitotically heritable.

Through utilizing insertion mutants, it was shown that the first FLC intron is essential for persistence of the silent state. Once FLC has been fully silenced this intron (normally expressing COLDAIR) is similarly silenced, however, the intronic sequence itself serves as a physical 3’ anchor point for the repressive intragenic loop.

The duration and stability of this epigenetic memory vary significantly between annual and perennial species. In annual A. thaliana, H3K27me3 levels at the FLC locus remain high under warm conditions following cold, creating a perpetuated state that maintains silencing throughout the plant's life cycle. In contrast, studies on the perennial A. halleri show that while H3K27me3 accumulates during winter to prevent rapid reactivation, these marks are eventually reset in response to warm temperatures. In these perennials, H3K27me3 functions as a buffer against temperature increases, moderating the rate of FLC reactivation rather than maintaining a permanent "OFF" state.

== Devernalization ==
It is possible to devernalize a plant by exposure to sometimes low and high temperatures subsequent to vernalization. For example, commercial onion growers store sets at low temperatures, but devernalize them before planting, because they want the plant's energy to go into enlarging its bulb (underground stem), not making flowers.

== See also ==
- Stratification (seeds)
