= Trofim Lysenko =

Soviet agronomist and pseudoscientist (1898–1976)

- Трофим Лысенко
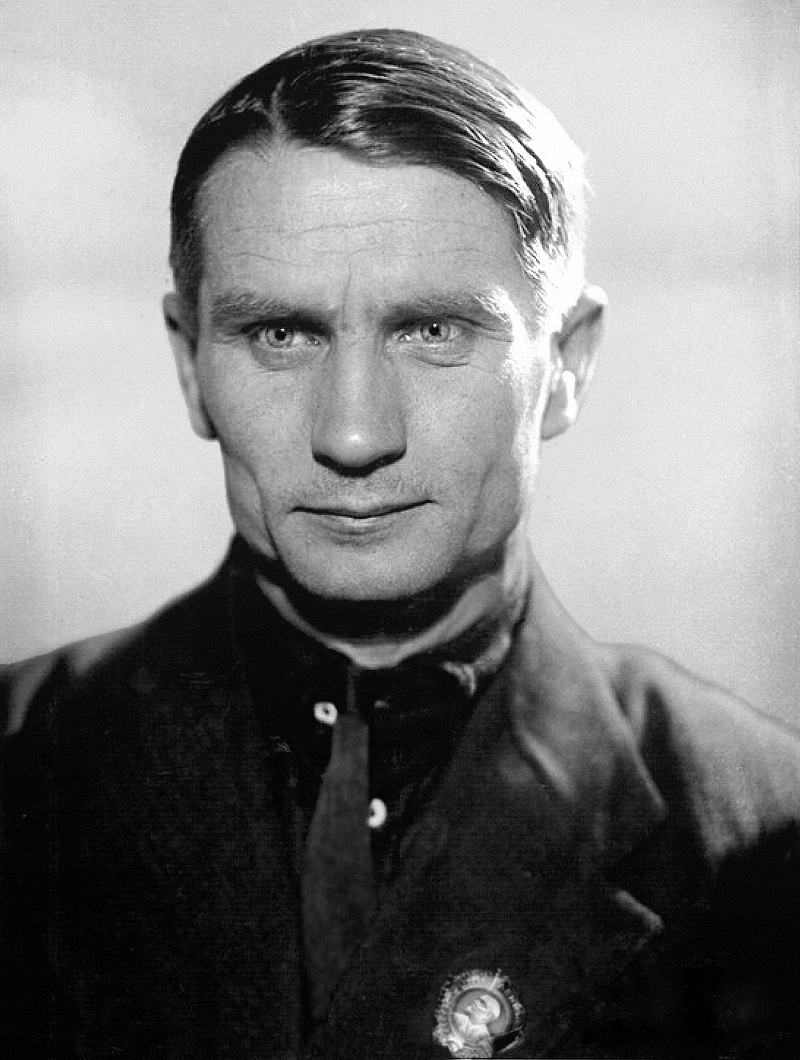
- Lysenko in 1938
- Born: Trofim Denisovich Lysenko; 29 September 1898; Karlovka, Poltava Governorate, Russian Empire (now Karlivka, Poltava Oblast, Ukraine)
- Died: 20 November 1976 (aged 78); Moscow, Russian SFSR, Soviet Union
- Education: Kiev Agricultural Institute (1925); Uman Agropolytechnicum (1921)
- Known for: Lysenkoism; Rejecting Mendelian inheritance; Vernalization
- Awards: Hero of Socialist Labour; Order of Lenin x8; Medal "For Labour Valour"; Jubilee Medal "In Commemoration of the 100th Anniversary of the Birth of Vladimir Ilyich Lenin"; Medal "For Valiant Labour in the Great Patriotic War 1941–1945"; Medal "In Commemoration of the 800th Anniversary of Moscow"; Stalin Prize x3
- Scientific career
- Fields: Biology; Agronomy
- Workplaces: Soviet Academy of Sciences
- Notable students: Artavazd Avakyan, Pyotr Kononkov

Signature
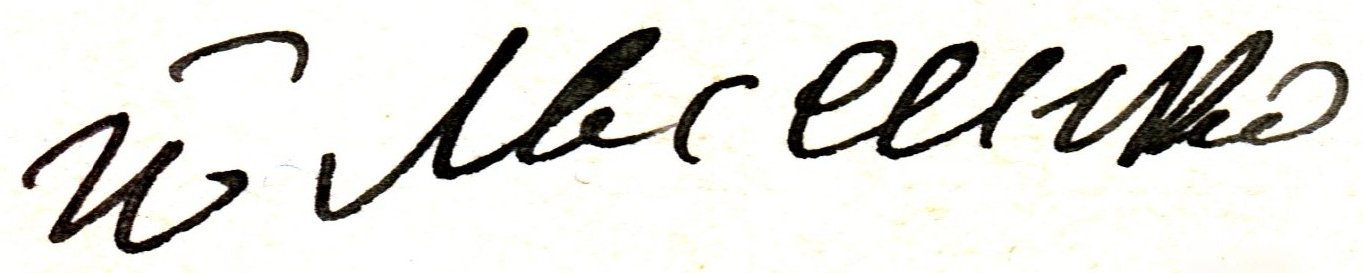

Trofim Denisovich Lysenko (Russian: Трофим Денисович Лысенко; Ukrainian: Троxим Денисович Лисенко, romanized: Trokhym Denysovych Lysenko, IPA: [troˈxɪm deˈnɪsowɪtʃ lɪˈsɛnko]; 29 September [O.S. 17 September] 1898 – 20 November 1976) was a Soviet agronomist. He rejected Mendelian genetics in favour of his own idiosyncratic, pseudoscientific ideas later termed Lysenkoism.

In 1940, Lysenko became director of the Institute of Genetics of the Soviet Academy of Sciences, and he used his political influence and power to suppress dissenting opinions and discredit, marginalize, and imprison his critics, elevating his anti-Mendelian theories to state-sanctioned doctrine.

Soviet scientists who refused to renounce genetics were dismissed from their posts and left destitute. Several were imprisoned including the botanist Nikolai Vavilov. Lysenko's ideas and practices contributed to lower agricultural yields in the Soviet Union throughout the late 1930s until his downfall in the mid-1960s; and found political and academic influence in other Eastern Bloc countries and China from the late 1940s through the mid-1950s.

== Early life and study ==
The son of Denis Nikanorovich and Oksana Fominichna Lysenko, Trofim Lysenko was born into a peasant family of Ukrainian ethnicity in the village of Karlovka, Poltava Governorate (present-day Poltava Oblast, Ukraine) on 29 September 1898. The family later welcomed two sons and a daughter.

Lysenko learned to read and write only at the age of 13. In 1913, after graduating from a two-year rural school, he entered the lower school of horticulture in Poltava. In 1917, he entered and in 1921 he graduated from the secondary school of horticulture in Uman (now the Uman National University of Horticulture).

Lysenko's period of study in Uman coincided with the First World War and the Russian Civil War: the city was captured by Austro-Hungarian troops, then by the Central Ukrainian Rada. In February 1918, Soviet power was proclaimed in Uman, after which until 1920 the city periodically passed into the hands of the Red and White Armies.

In 1922, Lysenko entered the Kiev Agricultural Institute (now the National University of Life and Environmental Sciences of Ukraine). During his studies, he worked at the Belotserkovsk experimental station as a garden plant breeder. In 1923, he published his first scientific works: "Techniques and methods of tomato selection at the Belotserkovskaya selection station" and "Grafting of sugar beets." Lysenko graduated from the institute with a degree in agronomy in 1925.

== Academic career ==
=== Work in Azerbaijan ===
In October 1925, Lysenko was sent to Azerbaijan, to a breeding station in the city of Ganja. The Ganja breeding station was part of the staff of the All-Union Institute of Applied Botany and New Crops (now the Institute of Plant Industry), created in 1925, which was headed by Nikolai Vavilov. The director of the station at that time was Nikolai Derevitsky, a specialist in mathematical statistics in agronomy. Derevitsky set Lysenko the task of introducing legume crops (lupine, clover, peavine, vetch) into Azerbaijan, in hopes of solving the problem of starvation of livestock in early spring, as well as increasing soil fertility when plowing these crops in the spring. Vavilov had done experiments on converting winter wheat into spring wheat. It was Vavilov who initially supported Lysenko and encouraged him in his work. In an article, Pravda correspondent Vitaly Fedorovich described his first impression of the meeting with Lysenko:

If you judge a person by first impression, then this Lysenko will leave you with a feeling of toothache - God bless him, he is a sad-looking person. And he is stingy with his words, and insignificant in face - all I remember is his gloomy eye, crawling along the ground with such an air as if, at least, he was going to kill someone.

Lysenko had a difficult time trying to grow various crops (such as peas and wheat) through the harsh winters. However, when he announced success, he was praised in the Soviet newspaper Pravda for his claims to have discovered a method to fertilize fields without using fertilizers or minerals, and to have shown that a winter crop of peas could be grown in Azerbaijan, "turning the barren fields of the Transcaucasus green in winter, so that cattle will not perish from poor feeding, and the peasant Turk will live through the winter without trembling for tomorrow."

Soon, Lysenko married one of the interns who trained under him, Alexandra Baskova. During the same period, breeder Donat Dolgushin, a future academic and supporter of Lysenko, began working with Lysenko.

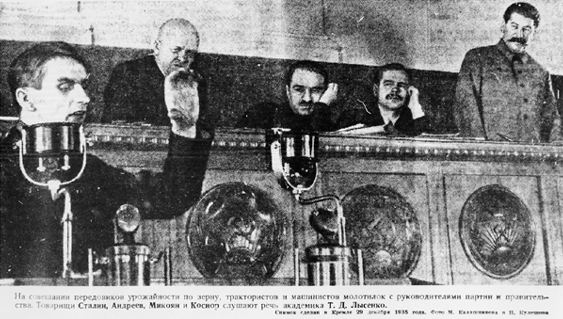
Lysenko speaking at the Kremlin in 1935. Behind him are Stanislav Kosior, Anastas Mikoyan, Andrei Andreyev and Joseph Stalin.

Lysenko worked with different wheat crops to try to convert them to grow in different seasons. Another area Lysenko found himself interested in was the effect of heat on plant growth. He believed that every plant needed a determinate amount of heat throughout its lifetime. He attempted to correlate the time and the amount of heat required by a particular plant to go through various phases of development. To get his data he looked at the amount of growth, how many days went by, and the temperature on those days, instead of measuring any actual heat. In trying to determine the effects, he was making mistakes in statistical analysis of data. He was confronted by Nikolai Maximov, who was an expert on thermal plant development. Lysenko did not take well to this or any criticism. After this encounter, Lysenko boldly claimed that mathematics had no place in biology.

His experimental research in improved crop yields earned him the support of the Soviet leader Joseph Stalin, especially following the famine and loss of productivity resulting from crop failures and forced collectivization in several regions of the Soviet Union in the early 1930s.

Lysenko considered how he might use his work to convert winter wheat into spring wheat. In 1927, Lysenko embarked on the research that would lead to his 1928 paper on vernalization, which drew wide attention because of its potential practical implications for Soviet agriculture. Severe cold and lack of winter snow had destroyed many early winter-wheat seedlings. By treating wheat seeds with moisture as well as cold, Lysenko induced them to bear a crop when planted in spring. Lysenko coined the term "Jarovization" (яровизация) to describe this chilling process, which he used to make the seeds of winter cereals behave like spring cereals. (Because spring cereals are called Jarovoe in Russian – from jarovój, an archaic adjective meaning spring, especially in relation to crops). However, this method had already been known by farmers since the 1800s, and had been discussed in detail by Gustav Gassner in 1918. Lysenko himself translated Jarovization as "vernalization" (from the Latin vernum meaning Spring). Lysenko's claims for increased yields were based on plantings over a few hectares, and he believed that the vernalized transformation could be inherited, that the offspring of a vernalized plant would themselves possess the capabilities of the generation that preceded it – that it too would be able to withstand harsh winters or imperfect weather conditions.

=== Work in Odessa ===
In October 1929, Lysenko was invited by the People's Commissariat of Ukraine to Odessa, to the newly formed Breeding and Genetics Institute (later the All-Union Breeding and Genetics Institute, or VSGI) where he headed the laboratory for vernalization of plants. People's Commissar of Agriculture of the Ukrainian SSR Alexander Schlichter reacted to Lysenko's ideas with enthusiasm and actively supported him. On 17 April 1936, he was appointed director of the VSGI.

In September 1931, the All-Ukrainian Breeding Conference adopted a resolution on a report by Lysenko, in which he noted the theoretical and practical significance of his work on vernalization. In October of the same year, a similar resolution was adopted by the All-Union Conference on Combating Drought. In 1933, he began experiments on summer planting potatoes in the south. In 1934, he was elected a full member of the Academy of Sciences of the Ukrainian SSR. In the same year, Ivan Michurin, speaking about the results of his scientific activities in his book Results of Sixty Years of Work, mentioned Lysenko's activities in studying the photoperiodism of field cereals. On 30 December 1935, Lysenko was awarded the Order of Lenin and elected a full member of the Lenin All-Union Academy of Agricultural Sciences.

=== After Odessa and first confrontation with geneticists ===
In August 1936, at a visiting session of the grain section of the All-Union Academy of Agricultural Sciences in Omsk, Lysenko made a report "On intravarietal crossing of self-pollinating plants," in which he entered into a discussion with Vavilov and other geneticists. In this discussion, Lysenko denied both the general theoretical views of his opponents and their practical implementation in breeding work. In particular, Lysenko denied the method of inbreeding field crops.

The discussion continued on 23 December 1936 at the 4th session of the All-Russian Academy of Agricultural Sciences, where Lysenko made a report "On two directions in genetics" (published in the collection Agrobiology by Lysenko). Lysenko, together with Isaak Prezent, referred to the opinion of Charles Darwin and Kliment Timiryazev on the issue of degeneration of self-pollinating plants and the usefulness of intra-varietal cross-pollination of plants.

In the spring of 1937, the journal Yarovizatsiya, founded and edited by Lysenko, published a speech by the head of the agricultural department of the Central Committee of the All-Union Communist Party of Bolsheviks, Yakov Yakovlev (No. 2), where Vavilov's theory of homological series of plant variability and the chromosomal theory of heredity were sharply criticized. The scientific discussion on genetics in the Soviet Union was transformed into a political struggle against "the enemies of the people." Issue 3 of Yarovizatsiya published an article by Prezent, in which he accused geneticists of the classical school of supporting the Trotskyist-Bukharinist opposition, and an article by Alexander Kohl that accused Vavilov of being a reactionary saboteur. The 7th International Genetic Congress in Moscow in 1937 was canceled and instead took place in 1939 in Edinburgh.

On 11 January 1938, the newspaper Sotszemledeliye published an article titled "Improve the Academy of Agricultural Sciences: Ruthlessly uproot enemies and their rumps from scientific institutions," where Vavilov, Mikhail Zavadovsky, and Pyotr Konstantinov were indicated as accomplices of the enemies of the people.

In 1938, Lysenko became president of the All-Union Academy of Agricultural Sciences. At the beginning of 1939, Yarovizatsiya published an article by Prezent "On pseudoscientific theories and genetics", in which Prezent compared the works of Vavilov with those of the anti-Marxist philosopher Eugen Dühring. In the same year, the journal Pod znamenem marksizma held a discussion on genetics. At the conclusion of this discussion, its organizer, philosopher Mark Mitin, sharply criticized the activities of Vavilov.

In 1939, According to official data, by changing the agricultural technology of millet, Lysenko allegedly increased the yield of millet from 2-3 to 15 centners per hectare. On 13 December 1942, at a session of the All-Union Academy of Agricultural Sciences, Lysenko argued that "in 1940, millet on millions of hectares had already become the highest-yielding grain crop" and called for "a turn towards millet." Lysenko proposed a system of spring cultivation for grain, which made it possible to clear the soil of weeds before sowing, and then sow with vernalized seeds.

In mid-1940, by Lysenko's order, NKVD employee S. N. Shundenko was appointed deputy director of the All-Union Research Institute of Plant Industry, despite the categorical protest of Vavilov, who wrote denunciations of the institute's workers. In August 1940, Vavilov was arrested; following this, Vavilov's employees and friends, Georgii Karpechenko, Grigory Levitsky, Leonid Govorov, and Konstantin Flaksberger, were arrested and died in custody.

=== Tree planting ===
As part of Stalin's Great Plan for the Transformation of Nature, Lysenko was involved in advising tree planting. He suggested that planting of trees need to be done in "nests". He claimed that when trees were planted at high densities their survival improved because they fought together against weeds and pooled their energy to benefit one shoot while sacrificing others in the nest. To encourage oak seedlings to fight collectively he had a central hole and found holes around them.

=== World War II ===
During World War II, Lysenko, along with many biologists, was evacuated to Omsk, where he continued to work on agricultural technology for grain crops and potatoes. From 1942, Lysenko was a member of the Extraordinary State Commission for the Establishment and Investigation of the Atrocities of the German Fascist Invaders.

On 22 March 1943, Lysenko received the Stalin Prize of the first degree "for the scientific development and introduction into agriculture of a method of planting potatoes with the tops of food tubers." On 3 June 1943, at a ceremonial meeting of the Soviet Academy of Sciences dedicated to the 100th anniversary of the birth of Kliment Timiryazev, Lysenko made a report: "K. A. Timiryazev and the tasks of our agrobiology." In 1943, the first edition of Lysenko's collection was published, titled Agrobiology: Work on genetics, breeding and seed production.

On 10 June 1945, Lysenko was awarded the title of Hero of Socialist Labor with the Order of Lenin, "for outstanding services in the development of agricultural science and increasing the productivity of agricultural crops, especially potatoes and millet." On 10 September 1945, Lysenko was awarded the Order of Lenin "for the successful completion of the government's task in difficult war conditions to provide the front and the country's population with food, and industry with agricultural raw materials."

=== Post-war ===
In 1946, Lysenko wrote an article titled "Genetics" for the 3rd edition of the Agricultural Encyclopedia. The article extensively quoted and criticized Thomas Hunt Morgan's article "Heredity," published in the United States in 1945 in the American Encyclopedia, and describes features of "Michurinist genetics." The article was included in the Agrobiology collection. A similar article was published in the second edition of the Great Soviet Encyclopedia.

==== August 1948 session of VASKhNIL ====
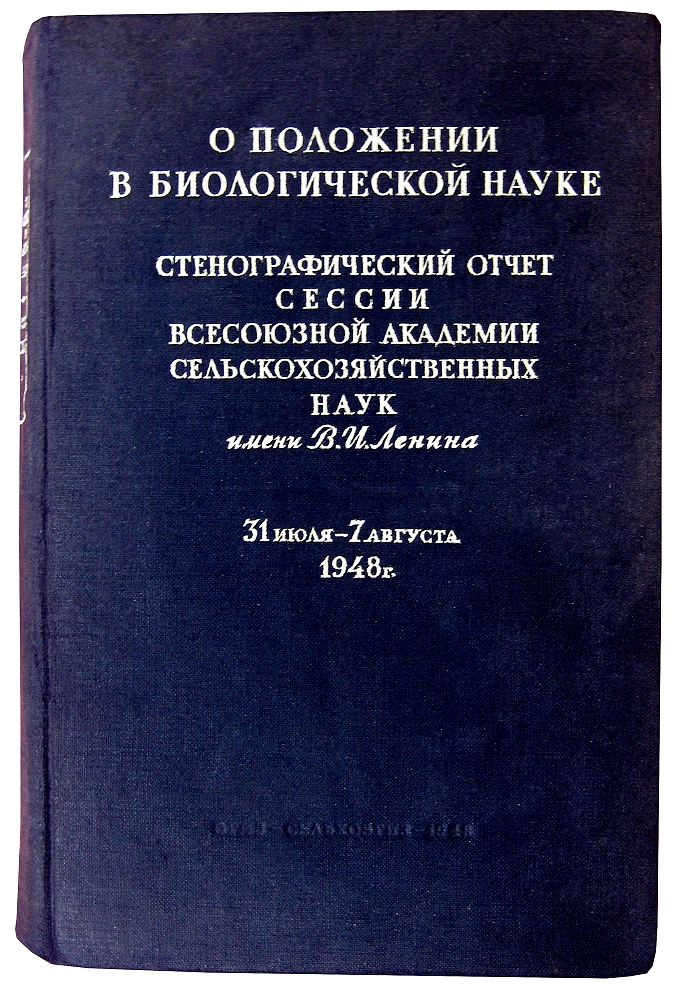
Verbatim report of the 1948 VASKhNIL session

On 10 April 1948, Yuri Zhdanov, who considered the complaints of scientists against Lysenko, made a report at the Polytechnic Museum at a seminar of regional party committee lecturers on the topic "Controversial issues of modern Darwinism." Lysenko himself listened to Zhdanov's critical speech over a loudspeaker in another room, since he was denied a ticket to the report.

From 31 July to 7 August 1948, a Session of the All-Union Academy of Agricultural Sciences (VASKhNIL) took place, at which most of the speakers supported Lysenko's biological views and pointed to the "practical successes" of specialists of the "Michurinist movement."

At the session, Lysenko presented erroneous views on genetics (denial of Mendel's law of segregation, denial of immutable "genes"), as well as politicized statements addressed to opponents (for example, Morgan's genetics was credited with justifying racism, eugenics, and serving the interests of the militaristic bourgeois class).

== Politics ==
During the early and mid twentieth century the Soviet Union went through war and revolution. Political oppression caused tension within the state but also promoted the flourishing of science: this was possible due to the flow of resources and demand for results. Lysenko aimed to manipulate various plants such as wheat and peas to increase their production, quality, and quantity, while impressing political officials with his success in motivating peasants to return to farming.

The Soviet Union's collectivist reforms forced the confiscation of agricultural landholdings from peasant farmers and heavily damaged the country's overall food production, and the dispossessed peasant farmers posed new problems for the regime. Many had abandoned the farms altogether; many more waged resistance to collectivization by poor work quality and pilfering. The dislocated and disenchanted peasant farmers were a major political concern to the USSR's leadership. Lysenko became prominent during this period by advocating radical but unproven agricultural methods, and also promising that the new methods provided wider opportunities for year-round work in agriculture. He proved himself very useful to the Soviet leadership by reengaging peasants to return to work, helping to secure from them a personal stake in the overall success of the Soviet revolutionary experiment.

Lysenko's success at encouraging farmers to return to working their lands impressed Stalin, who also approved of Lysenko's peasant background, as Stalin claimed to stand with the proletariat. By the late 1920s, the USSR's leaders had given their support to Lysenko. This support was a consequence, in part, of policies put in place by the Communist Party to rapidly promote members of the proletariat into leadership positions in agriculture, science and industry. Party officials were looking for promising candidates with backgrounds similar to Lysenko's: born of a peasant family, lacking formal academic training or affiliations to the academic community. Due to his close partnership with Stalin, Lysenko acquired an influence over genetics in the Soviet Union during the early and mid-20th century. Lysenko eventually became the director of Genetics for the Academy of Sciences in 1940, which gave him even more control over genetics. He remained in the position for more than two decades, throughout the reigns of Stalin and Nikita Khrushchev, until he was relieved of his duties in 1965.

Outside the Soviet Union, scientists spoke critically: British biologist S. C. Harland lamented that Lysenko was "completely ignorant of the elementary principles of genetics and plant physiology" (Bertram Wolfe, 2017). Criticism from foreigners did not sit well with Lysenko, who loathed Western "bourgeois" scientists and denounced them as tools of imperialist oppressors. He especially detested the American-born practice of studying fruit flies, the workhorse of modern genetics. He called such geneticists "fly lovers and people haters".

== Repression of biologists ==
In the spring of 1937, shortly after Stalin's report at the March plenum of the Central Committee of the All-Union Communist Party of Bolsheviks "On the shortcomings of party work and measures to eliminate Trotskyists and other double-dealers," Lysenko and his supporters, including Isaak Prezent and Alexander Kohl, began their campaign against geneticists, accusing them of colluding with the anti-Stalinist opposition and reactionary sabotage.

During the 1930s and '40s, the V.I. Lenin Academy of Agricultural Sciences (VASKhNIL) served as a floor for debate between Lysenkoists and geneticists. On 7 August 1948, at the end of a week-long session organized by Lysenko and approved by Stalin, the VASKhNIL announced that from that point on Lysenkoism would be taught as "the only correct theory." Soviet scientists were forced to denounce any work that contradicted Lysenko. Prezent accused the geneticists, whom Lysenko and supporters termed "Weismannists-Mendelists-Morganists", of ideological unreliability. At the 1948 VASKhNIL session, Prezent said:

We are encouraged to debate here. We will not discuss with the Morganists, we will continue to expose them as representatives of a harmful and ideologically alien movement, brought to us from foreign countries, pseudoscientific in its essence.

Several geneticists who refused to denounce the theory were executed (including Izrail Agol, Solomon Levit, Grigorii Levitskii, Georgii Karpechenko and Georgii Nadson) or sent to labor camps. One prominent critic of Lysenko, the famous Soviet geneticist and president of the Agriculture Academy, Nikolai Vavilov, was arrested in 1940 and died in prison in 1943. Before the 1930s, the Soviet Union had arguably the best genetics community. According to The Atlantic writer Sam Kean, "Lysenko gutted it, and by some accounts, set Russian biology and agronomy back a half-century". Lysenko's work was eventually recognized as fraudulent by some, "but not before he had wrecked the lives of many and destroyed the reputation of Russian biology" according to scientist Peter Gluckman.

== Consequences of Lysenko's views ==
Lysenko forced farmers to plant seeds very close together since, according to his "law of the life of species", plants from the same "class" never compete with one another. Lysenko's ideas and practices contributed to lower agricultural yields in the Soviet Union throughout the late 1930s until his downfall in the mid-1960s. Lysenko's ideas found influence in China for several years, from the establishment of the People's Republic of China in 1949, through 1956, when a genetics conference in Qingdao spurred the resumption of genetics teaching and research in the country. The Atlantic writer Sam Kean contends that Chinese agricultural methods utilized in the late 1950s were inspired by Lysenko, and contributed to the Great Chinese Famine of 1959 to 1962.

== After Stalin ==
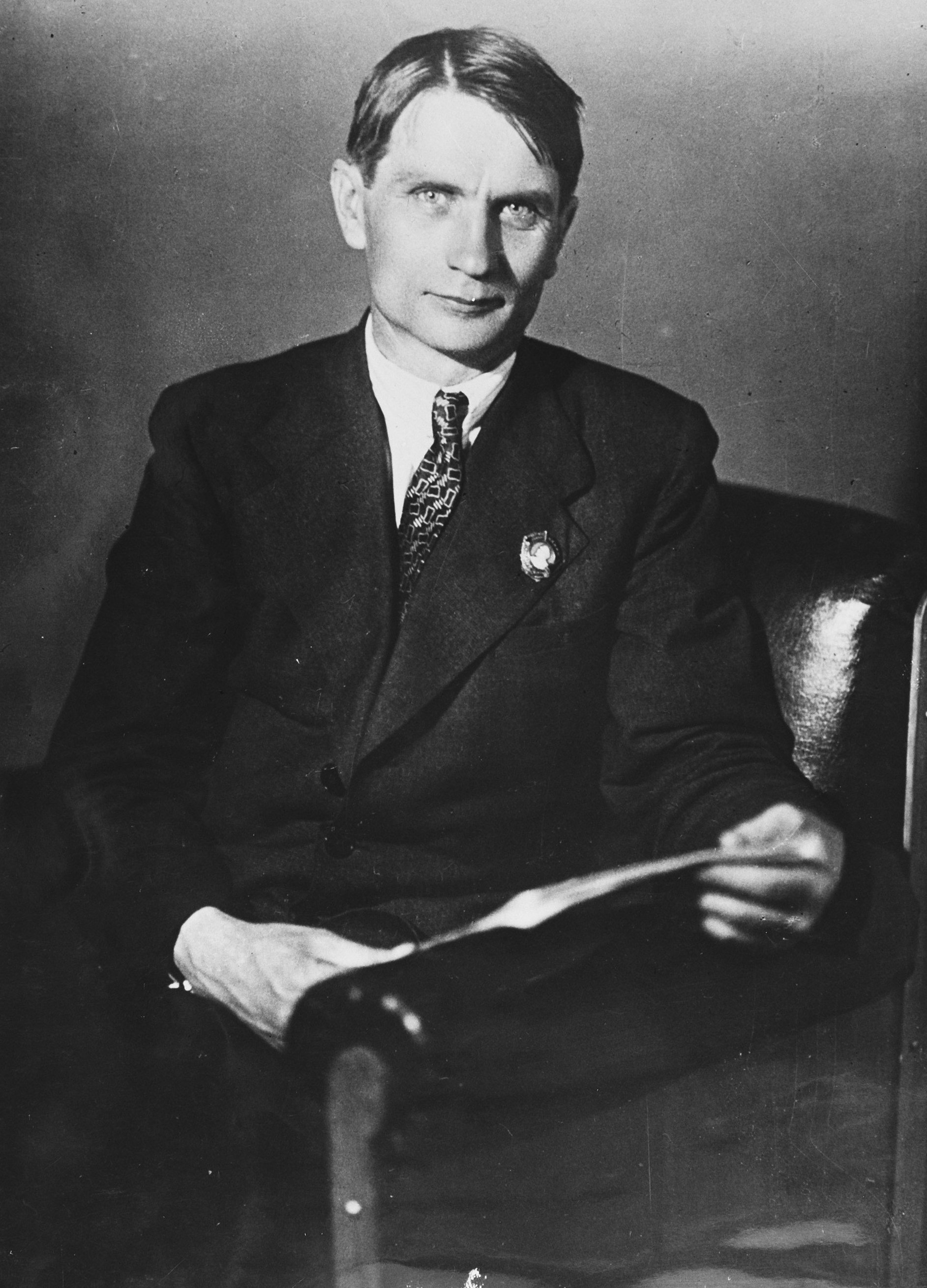
Lysenko in 1959

In 1955, an attempt was made to disempower Lysenko, with a letter signed by more than three hundred scientists, the so-called "Letter of three hundred", which was sent to Nikita Khrushchev. It led to Lysenko resigning temporarily but he returned to power through Khrushchev's efforts. Though Lysenko remained at his post in the Institute of Genetics until 1965, his influence on Soviet agricultural practice had declined after the death of Stalin in 1953. Lysenko retained his position, with the support of the new leader Nikita Khrushchev. However, mainstream scientists re-emerged and found new willingness within Soviet government leadership to tolerate criticism of Lysenko, the first opportunity since the late 1920s. In 1962, three of the most prominent Soviet physicists, Yakov Zeldovich, Vitaly Ginzburg, and Pyotr Kapitsa, presented a case against Lysenko, proclaiming his work as pseudoscience. They also denounced Lysenko's application of political power to silence opposition and eliminate his opponents within the scientific community. These denunciations occurred during a period of structural upheaval in Soviet government, during which the major institutions were purged of the strictly ideological and political machinations which had controlled the work of the Soviet Union's scientific community for several decades under Stalin.

In 1964, physicist Andrei Sakharov spoke out against Lysenko in the General Assembly of the Academy of Sciences of the USSR:

He is responsible for the shameful backwardness of Soviet biology and of genetics in particular, for the dissemination of pseudo-scientific views, for adventurism, for the degradation of learning, and for the defamation, firing, arrest, even death, of many genuine scientists.

The Soviet press was soon filled with anti-Lysenkoite articles and appeals for the restoration of scientific methods to all fields of biology and agricultural science. In 1965, Lysenko was removed from his post as director of the Institute of Genetics at the Academy of Sciences and restricted to an experimental farm in Moscow's Lenin Hills (the Institute itself was soon dissolved). After Khrushchev's dismissal in 1964, the president of the Academy of Sciences declared that Lysenko's immunity to criticism had officially ended. An expert commission was sent to investigate records kept at Lysenko's experimental farm. His secretive methods and ideas were revealed. A few months later, a devastating critique of Lysenko was made public. Consequently, Lysenko was immediately disgraced in the Soviet Union.

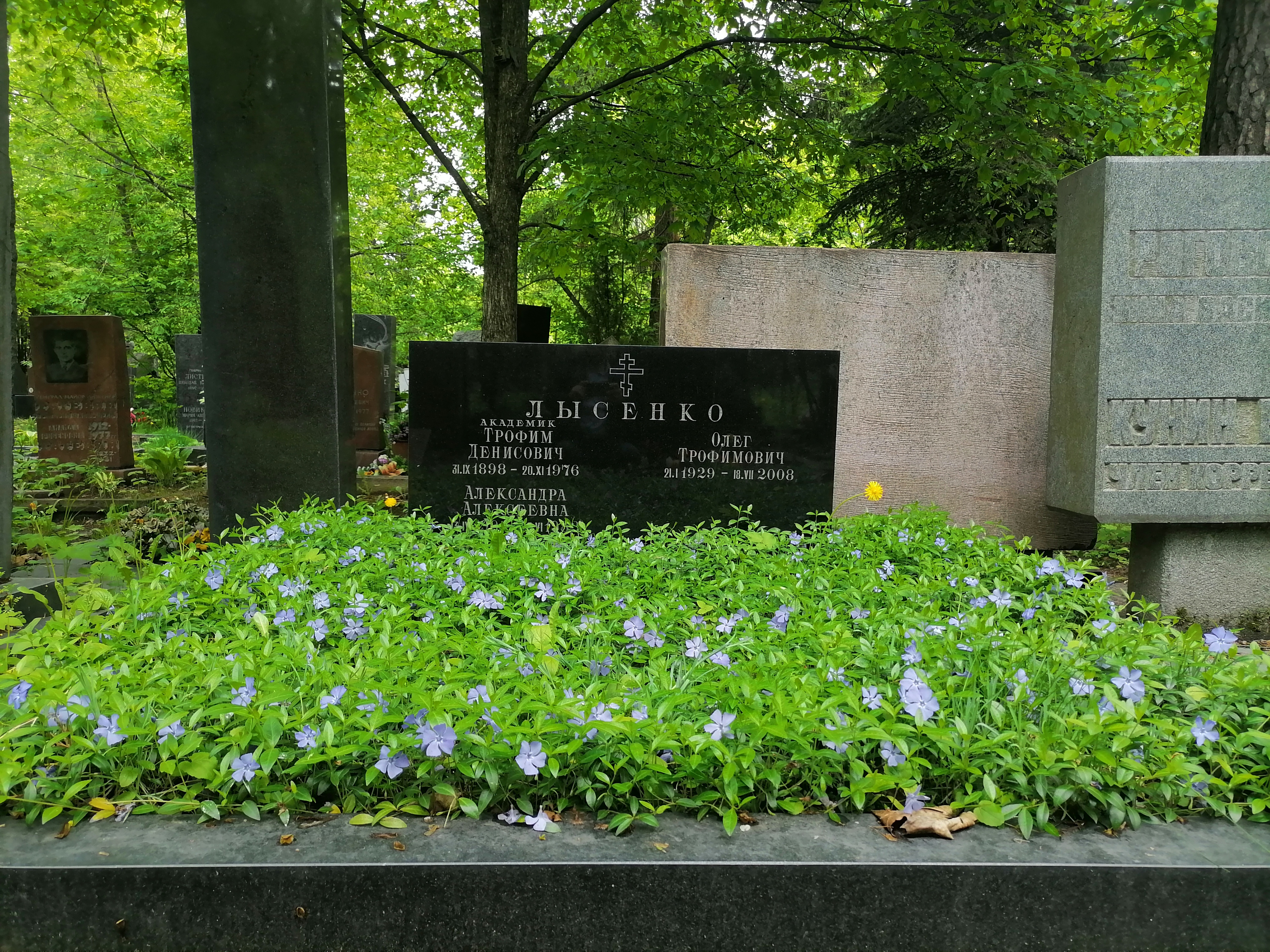
Lysenko's grave at the Kuntsevo Cemetery in Moscow

After Lysenko's monopoly on biology and agronomy had ended, it took many years for these sciences to recover in Russia. Lysenko died in Moscow in 1976, and was ultimately interred in the Kuntsevo Cemetery, although the Soviet government refused to announce Lysenko's death for two days after the event and gave his passing only a small note in Izvestia.

== Lysenko's theories ==
Lysenko proposed an influence of the body on inheritance similar to Darwin's pangenesis theory, that every part of the body emits tiny gemmules which migrate to the gonads and are transferred to offspring. Gemmules were thought to develop into their associated body parts as the offspring matures. The theory implied that changes to the body during an organism's life would be inherited, as proposed in Lamarckism.

Lysenko rejected Mendelian genetic inheritance theory in favour of his own logic, which he termed "Michurinist genetics". He believed Gregor Mendel's theory to be too reactionary or idealist. Lysenko's ideas were a mixture of his own, those of Russian agronomist Ivan Michurin, and of other Soviet scientists. Through this mixture of ideas, Lysenko founded the "Michurinist doctrine". The core ideas are that body cells (the soma) determine the quality of an organism's offspring; every part of the body contributes to the germ cells, in the manner of Darwin's theory of pangenesis, though Lysenko denied any such connection.

These ideas were not directly derived from established biological theories such as Mendelian genetics, Lamarckism or Darwinism. He shaped his genetic concepts to support the simple practical purpose of breeding and improving crops. His ideas were also shaped to disprove other claims made by his fellow geneticists. His ideas and genetic claims later began to be termed "Lysenkoism". He claimed that his ideas were not associated with Lamarckism, but there are similarities between the two ideas, such as a belief in the inheritance of acquired characteristics. Some of Lysenko's ideas can also seem to be vitalistic. He claimed that plants are self-sacrificing—they do not die due to a lack of sunlight or moisture but so that healthy ones may live and when they die they deposit themselves over the growing roots to help the new generation survive.

One of several unsubstantiated Lysenkoist claims: vegetative hybridisation. The mechanism would imply an unobserved Lamarckian effect of scion on stock when a fruit tree is grafted.

Lysenko believed that in one generation of a hybridized crop, the desired individual could be selected, mated again and continue to produce the same desired product, not worrying about separation/segregation in future breeds. For that to work, he had to assume that after a lifetime of developing (acquiring) the best set of traits to survive, those were passed down to the next generation. That assumption disregarded the potential for variation or mutation.

Lysenko did not believe in genes and only spoke about them to say that they did not exist. He instead believed that any body, once alive, obtained heredity. That meant that the entirety of the body was able to pass on the hereditary information of that organism, and was not entirely dependent on a special element such as DNA or genes. That puzzled biologists at that time because it went against established notions of heredity and inheritance. It also contradicted the Mendelian principles that most biologists had been using to base their ideas on. Most scientists believed that Lysenko's ideas were not credible, because they did not truly explain the mechanisms of inheritance. Biologists now consider that his beliefs are pseudo-scientific, with little relationship to genetics.

Lysenko argued that there is not only competition, but also mutual assistance among individuals within a species, and that mutual assistance also exists between different species.

According to Lysenko,

The organism and the conditions required for its life are an inseparable unity. Different living bodies require different environmental conditions for their development. By studying these requirements we come to know the qualitative features of the nature of organisms, the qualitative features of heredity. Heredity is the property of a living body to require definite conditions for its life and development and to respond in a definite way to various conditions.

Another of Lysenko's theories was that obtaining more milk from cows did not depend on their genetics but on how they were treated. The better they were handled and taken care of, the more milk would be obtained; Lysenko and his followers were well known for taking very good care of their livestock. Lysenko claimed that the cuckoo was born when young birds such as warblers were fed hairy caterpillars by the parent (rather than host) birds; this claim failed to recognise that the cuckoos he described were brood parasites. Lysenkoites believed that fertilization was not random, but that there was specific selection of the best mate. For reasons like these, Lysenkoism can be viewed as pseudo-scientific.

After World War II ended, Lysenko took an interest in the works of Olga Lepeshinskaya, an older feldsher and biologist, who claimed to be able to create cells from egg yolk and non-cellular matter. Lepeshinskaya recognized common ground between her ideas and Lysenko's. By combining both of their ideas it was possible to proclaim that cells could grow from non-cellular material and that the predicted ratios of Mendelian genetics and meiosis were incorrect, thus undermining the basis of modern cytology, as well as genetics.

=== "The influence of the thermal factor on the duration of plant development phases" ===
In Ganja, Lysenko began work on studying the growing season of agricultural plants (cotton, wheat, rye, oats, and barley). For two years, Lysenko experimented with the timing of sowing grain, cotton and other plants, sowing plants at intervals of 10 days. Based on the results of these studies, in 1928, he published a large work, "The influence of the thermal factor on the duration of plant development phases." Of the 169 pages of the work, 110 contained tables with primary data. The mathematical processing of the data was carried out by Nikolai Derevitsky and I. Yu. Staroselsky.

In this work, Lysenko came to the conclusion that each phase of plants ("the following phases were recorded: sowing-watering, germination, tillering, booting, heading, flowering, wax ripeness and harvesting time") begins its development "at a strictly defined intensity of thermal energy, that is, at a certain, always constant degree Celsius, and requires a certain amount of degree days." Carrying out mathematical processing of the initial data using the least squares method, Lysenko determined the values of the constants A and B - "the starting point at which processes begin" and "the sum of degrees required to complete the phase."

In 1927, the main provisions of this work were reported by Lysenko at the "congress convened by the People's Commissariat for Agriculture of the Azerbaijan SSR at the Ganja station," and then, in December 1928, at the All-Union Meeting of Sugar Trust in Kiev. In this book, Lysenko thrice cited the work of Gavriil Zaitsev, dedicated to the same issues.

=== Vernalization ===
The issue of the effect of low temperatures on plant development was touched upon by such famous physiologists as Georg Klebs and Gustav Gassner. For example, Gassner, based on his experiments, established that if sprouted seeds of winter crops are exposed to low temperatures, then the plants grown from them during spring sowing will split.

Working at the Ganja breeding station, Lysenko was also able to accelerate the development of plants. Based on his experiments, he developed a technique for germinating seeds before sowing at low positive temperatures, which he termed vernalization.

This technique was supported by a number of prominent scientists in the early 1930s. For example, Nikolai Vavilov saw the main advantage of vernalization in the possible simplification of breeding work, as well as in the ability to control the length of the growing season of plants. In addition, he believed that vernalization could help preserve winter crops from freezing during harsh winters. Vavilov wrote:

It can definitely be argued that vernalization is the greatest achievement in breeding, because it has made available for use the entire world variety of varieties, which were still inaccessible for practical use due to the usual inconsistency of the growing season and the low winter hardiness of southern winter forms.

The main reason Vavilov initially supported Lysenko's work on vernalization was his interest in the potential use of vernalization as a means of synchronizing the flowering of various plant species in the Institute of Plant Industry collection, since Vavilov's team had encountered problems in cross-species experiments that required such synchronization. Vavilov, however, eventually stopped supporting the use of vernalization because the method did not produce the expected results.

Crops with vernalized seeds increased on USSR farms every year. In particular, in 1935, experimental vernalized crops of spring grain were carried out by more than 40,000 collective and state farms on an area of 2.1 million hectares; in 1937, 8.9 million hectares.

However, the mass introduction of vernalization into USSR agriculture ended in failure. Critics of vernalization explained this failure, among other things, by the lack of experimental data on varieties and regions of the Soviet Union. To collect data, questionnaires were sent to collective and state farms. The questionnaire method made it possible to fabricate data, suppress negative results, and was convenient for promoting vernalization. The data obtained by Lysenko and his supporters was published mainly in the journal Byulleten yarovizatsii, published under the editorship of Lysenko, or in the Soviet press. However, these publications were not published in any independent scientific journals.

The agricultural method of vernalization has been criticized by experts for reasons such as the possibility of damage to seeds during the process of soaking, germination and sowing, the labor intensity of this operation, and the greater vulnerability of vernalized plants to smut. Critics of vernalization in the 1930s included Pyotr Konstantinov, S. Levitsky (Poland), Pyotr Lisitsyn, and Doncho Kostov.

Vernalization of grain crops during World War II (spring of 1942-1945) and the post-war period did not receive widespread industrial use. Pravda, in an editorial dated 14 December 1958, argued that after the massive introduction of technology on Soviet farms, which made it possible to sow in a shorter time, vernalization of seeds "was not always necessary." However, vernalization, according to the newspaper, continued to produce "remarkable results" in the cultivation of millet and potatoes.

=== Theory of stage development of plants ===
To substantiate his developments in the field of plant growing, Lysenko put forward a theory of staged development of plants. The essence of the theory was that higher plants must go through several stages during their lives before producing seeds. To move to the next stage, certain specific conditions are required.

In 1935, Lysenko wrote:

This theory proceeds from the fact that everything in a plant, each of its properties, characteristics, etc., is the result of the development of a hereditary basis in specific environmental conditions. The hereditary basis is the result of the entire previous phylogenetic history. The result of this biological history, which was created through the selection of adaptations to certain conditions of existence, are the demands that a plant organism throughout its individual history, starting from the zygote, makes for certain conditions of its development. These requirements are the reverse side of the adaptations developed in the historical process.

Based on this theory, Lysenko proposed vernalization of winter and spring grains, potatoes and other crops.

The provisions of Lysenko's theory on the staged development of plants, according to critics, were to some extent consistent with the level of knowledge of the 1930s, but not all of them were confirmed experimentally. The shortcomings of the theory of stage development were pointed out by Mikhail Chailakhyan among others. In particular, critics argued that even without preliminary vernalization, various plant varieties have a photoperiodic reaction and are delayed in development when the length of daylight hours is reduced.

=== Summer potato planting ===
In the southern regions of the Soviet Union, vegetatively propagated potatoes gradually produced increasingly smaller tubers, which, in addition, were subject to severe rotting. To combat this, Lysenko proposed summer planting of potatoes, arguing that the "deterioration of the breed" of potatoes can be stopped by planting them not in warm, but in cool soil, at the end of summer.

On 11 January 1941, in a lecture given at the Polytechnic Museum, Lysenko stated:

Previously, it was common knowledge that if, under comparable conditions, planting material of at least the Early Rose variety, obtained from the harvest of the Moscow region, and planting material of the same variety, but obtained from the harvest of the Odessa region, are planted, then almost without exception, the yield of planting material from the Moscow region will always be significantly greater than the yield of planting material from the Odessa region. Now we can cite a lot of experimental data of the opposite order. And in the past, 1940, in the experiments of Ivan Glushchenko (research associate at the Institute of Genetics of the USSR Academy of Sciences) on a site near Moscow, a crop of potatoes of the Early Rose variety was obtained from tubers of summer southern reproduction (Breeding and Genetics Institute, Odessa) 480.5 centners per hectare, and under the same conditions the same variety of local origin (Moscow region, Institute of Potato Farming) yielded a yield of 219.5 centners per hectare. All this suggests that summer planting potatoes in the south is not a way to stop the degeneration of the potato breed, but a way to improve the potato breed.

However, as with vernalization, data was collected using questionnaires, making the results easy to falsify, and any scientific data obtained was never published. When summer planting did not produce any positive results, Lysenko suggested burying the harvested potatoes in trenches, spreading a layer of soil over a layer of potatoes, arguing that this would reduce losses from rotting tubers. However, burying tubers in trenches led to huge crop losses, as the rotting of the tubers only intensified.

Lysenko ignored the real reason for the degeneration of potato plantings - potato viruses (a particularly large role in the degeneration is played by the potato leafroll virus - PLRV, potato virus X - PVX, and potato virus Y - PVY), replacing it with abstract ideas about the "deterioration of the potato breed". Ignoring the role of viruses in the degeneration of potato plantings and the subsequent ban on research into plant viruses led to a significant delay in the development of methods for detecting plant viruses in the Soviet Union, the spread of viruses not only in the south, but also in other regions of the Soviet Union, and, as a result, to a sharp drop in potato yields.

=== Sowing over stover ===
Soviet literature of the 1940s-50s and Lysenko's supporters credit him with a number of achievements, including the idea of sowing over stover to protect winter crops from frost.

In 1943, Lysenko stated:

Stover 25-30 cm in height protects the above-ground parts of plants from the destructive mechanical action of the wind. The stubble retains snow, which also protects plants not only from frost, but also from the action of winds. Unplowed, unloosened soil has almost no large voids. Therefore, on stover crops, large ice crystals are not observed in the soil, which have a detrimental effect, damaging the roots and tillering nodes of winter plants.

Sowing over stover, despite the advantages of the method (snow retention and better temperature conditions for wintering plant seeds in Siberian conditions), was criticized for clogging fields with weeds, since this excludes conventional agricultural technology - surface plowing, which provokes the germination of weeds, and subsequent spring plowing. In the absence of herbicides at that time, this led to clogging of fields.

Nikolai Tsitsin, in a letter to Stalin dated 2 February 1948, noted the low grain yield in stubble crops:

In 1944, in seven registered districts of the Novosibirsk region, the average yield of winter rye stubble was 3.6 c/ha. In the same year in the Chelyabinsk region, the average rye yield was equal to very poor fallows - 4.3 c/ha; for fresh September plowing - 2.6 c/ha; for stover - 1.8 c/ha. In the same year, for all state farms of the Omsk Grain Trust of the Ministry of State Farms, the stover yield was also very low; — it was equal to 11.1 c/ha for fallows and 5.1 c/ha for stover. ... In 1945, in one of the best state farms in the Omsk region, "Lesnoy", from an area of winter wheat crops of 91 hectares, sown according to all the rules recommended by Academician Lysenko, only 6 centners of grain were collected, that is, an average of 7 kg per hectare, as well as several huge stacks of weeds, which, by the way, had become seeded in their mass by the time of harvesting. In the same year, on the neighboring state farm "Boevoy", all 67 hectares of stover crops of winter wheat were completely destroyed. Finally, last year, 1946, at the same Siberian Research Institute, headed by Academician Lysenko, out of 150 [ha] of stover crops, 112 hectares were plowed, since only one weed was born on them.

Citing negative examples of stover crops, Tsitsin explained positive examples by the fact that "in the harsh conditions of Siberia, there are occasionally exceptionally favorable years." In general, he considered work on stover unpromising, considering instead that work to increase the winter hardiness of grains with wheatgrass-wheat hybrids, distant hybridization with wild plants, and the use of fallows and semi-cultivated fallows were more justified.

=== Inheritance of acquired traits ===
Fundamental disagreements between Mendelian geneticists and Lysenko concerned the possibility of inheritance of traits that arise during the individual development of organisms, for example, under the influence of environmental factors or during grafting (vegetative hybridization). The idea that such characteristics cannot be inherited is associated with a distorted understanding of the principle formulated by August Weismann, according to which somatic cells cannot transmit information to germ cells. In fact, Weismann admitted the possibility of environmental influence on the substance of heredity.

Lysenko himself, at the August 1948 VASKhNIL session, argued the following regarding the inheritance of acquired characteristics:

Thus, the position about the possibility of inheritance of acquired deviations - this is the largest acquisition in the history of biological science, the foundation of which was laid by Lamarck and organically mastered later in the teachings of Darwin - was thrown overboard by the Mendelian-Morganists.

== Works ==
- Soviet Biology: A Report to the Lenin Academy of Agricultural Sciences, Moscow, 1948. London: Birch Books. 1948. LCCN 71233756.
- The Science of Biology Today. New York: International Publishers. 1948. LCCN 48011965.
- Heredity and its Variability. Moscow: Foreign Languages Publishing House. 1951. LCCN 52043640.
- New Developments in the Science of Biological Species. Moscow: Foreign Languages Publishing House. 1952. LCCN 52043304.
- Agrobiology: Essays on Problems of Genetics, Plant Breeding and Seed Growing. Moscow: Foreign Languages Publishing House. 1954. LCCN 54042652.
- Soil Nutrition Of Plants. Translated by Lasker, I. Moscow: Foreign Languages Publishing House. 1957. LCCN 58037123.

== Honours and awards ==
- Hero of Socialist Labor (1945)
- Order of Lenin, eight times (1935, 1945, 1945, 1948, 1949, 1953, 1958, 1961)
- Medal "For Labour Valour" (1959)
- Jubilee Medal "In Commemoration of the 100th Anniversary of the Birth of Vladimir Ilyich Lenin" (1969)
- Medal "For Valiant Labour in the Great Patriotic War 1941–1945" (1945)
- Medal "In Commemoration of the 800th Anniversary of Moscow" (1947)
- Stalin Prize, three times (1941, 1943, 1949)
- Order of the Red Banner of Labor of the Ukrainian SSR (1931)
- Gold Medal named after I.I. Mechnikov (1950)

== Legacy ==
In the Soviet Union, streets named after Lysenko existed in several cities, such as Krasnoturyinsk.

Arkady and Boris Strugatsky cited Lysenko as the inspiration for the character of Professor Ambrosy Ambruazovich Vybegallo from their 1965 satirical science fantasy novel Monday Begins on Saturday:

Professor Vibegallo is based on the once-famous academician Lysenko, who put all of Russian biology on all fours, spent more than thirty years doing nonsense and at the same time not only destroyed our entire biological science, but also trampled everything around, destroying (physically, with the help of the NKVD) all the best geneticists of the USSR, starting with Vavilov. Our Vibegallo is exactly the same demagogue, ignorant and boorish, but he is far from his prototype!

— Boris Strugatsky

During the late 2010s, Lysenko's ideas attracted a renewed following in Russia, linked to a strain of Russian nationalism that views "Western" ideas and mainstream science with suspicion.

== See also ==
- Agriculture in the Soviet Union
- Jean-Baptiste Lamarck
- VASKhNIL
- Olga Lepeshinskaya
