= Olga Lepeshinskaya (biologist) =

Soviet biologist

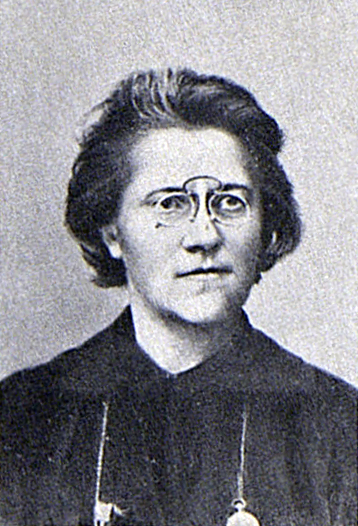
- Born: Olga Borisovna Protopopova; August 18, 1871; Perm, Permsky Uyezd, Perm Governorate, Russian Empire
- Died: October 2, 1963 (aged 92); Moscow, Russian SFSR, Soviet Union
- Spouse: Panteleimon Lepeshinsky
- Scientific career
- Fields: Biology

Olga Borisovna Lepeshinskaya (Russian: Ольга Борисовна Лепешинская), née Protopopova (Протопопова; August 18, 1871 – October 2, 1963), was a Russian revolutionary and Soviet pseudoscientist, who advanced her career as a biologist in the USSR Academy of Medical Sciences through fraudulent claims and personal ties with Vladimir Lenin, Joseph Stalin, Trofim Lysenko and Alexander Oparin. She rejected genetics and was an advocate of spontaneous generation of life from inanimate matter.

== Biography ==
Lepeshinskaya completed her study as a feldsher in St. Petersburg in 1887 and practised at various places in Siberia. She joined a Marxist group in St Petersburg in 1894, and married a fellow Marxist, Panteleimon Nikolaievich Lepeshinsky (1868–1944), a priest's son who was expelled from St Petersburg University in 1895 for his political activities. They were both arrested and exiled in 1897, for three years, to Yermakovsk, in Siberia, 32 kilometers from Minusinsk, where Lenin was in exile. Both became loyal supporters of Lenin and joined the Russian Social Democratic Labour Party (RSDLP) when it was founded, in 1898. After Lenin had launched the newspaper Iskra, they acted as its agents in Pskov north west Russia, until 1903, when they emigrated to Geneva and opened a cafe. This became the main meeting point for the Bolsheviks who supported Lenin at a time when he was outnumbered among the Russian exiles by the Mensheviks and was furthermore under pressure to settle the rift within the RSDLP.

According to one witness who was in Geneva at the time, Lepeshinskaya "worshipped Lenin rather as a sentimental schoolgirl worships her teachers", whereas she was "a very formidable and businesslike woman, who uttered with great aplomb the most simplistic opinions....Her general level of education was nothing to boast of, and at that time she showed no special interest in science, or biology." Lenin's opinion was that "[Panteleimon] won't go far wrong with her."

The couple returned to Russia to take part in the 1905 revolution, but after its failure, they gave up political activity and took up teaching. In 1915, she completed her medical training in Moscow. She obtained a medical licence and was assistant professor of therapy at Moscow University

Lepeshinskaya was a participant in the October Revolution. She lectured at the University of Medicine in Moscow until 1926, briefly interrupted by a 1919 stay at the Tashkent University, then worked at the Kliment Timiryazev Institute of Biology. In 1941 she became the head of the Department of Live Matter at the Institute of Experimental Biology with the USSR Academy of Medical Sciences for the remainder of her career.

Lepeshinskaya worked well into her eighties and died in Moscow from pneumonia on 2 October 1964, aged 92. Her body was cremated and her ashes buried in the Novodevichy Cemetery's columbarium, alongside her husband's.

== Claims ==
In the 1920s Lepeshinskaya discredited the work of her supervisor, Alexander Gurwitsch, who investigated biophotons and mitogenic rays. She claimed that low doses of ultraviolet light were released by dying cells that had been treated with high doses of UV light. Later she claimed that cells could propagate by disintegration into granules which could generate new forms of cells, different from the parental cells. Also, crystals of inorganic matter could be converted into cells by adding nucleic acids. Further, she espoused spontaneous generation and the presence of a "vital substance". These claims were propagated as official dogma in the Soviet Union. A claim that soda baths fostered rejuvenation led to a temporary shortage of baking soda. She based her career on claims to observe de novo emergence of living cells from non-cellular materials, supporting such claims with fabricated proofs which were "confirmed" by others eager to advance in the politicized scientific system. In reality, she filmed the death and subsequent decomposition of cells, then projected these films reversed.

On May 22–24, 1950 at the special symposium "Live Matter and Cell Development" for the USSR Academy of Sciences and the USSR Academy of Medical Sciences that was supported by Stalin and chaired by Alexander Oparin, Lepeshinskaya gave the keynote speech, and her "discoveries" were celebrated as revolutionary by the invited audience. She was the recipient of the Stalin Prize for that year, and her ideas became mandatory instruction in biology. In 1952 a second conference took place to demonstrate "using experimental methods" that the bourgeois Virchowian concept of cell development (only a living cell can produce another cell) was replaced by a "new dialectical-materialistic theory on the origin of all living cells from non-living matter." While her impact and dogmatic dominance have parallels to those of Lysenko, her claims were never officially renounced, instead they just faded away.

She involved her daughter Olga and her son-in-law Vladimir Kryukov in her work; in contrast, her husband, Panteleimon Lepechinsky, thought little of it. "Don’t you listen to her. She’s totally ignorant about science and everything she’s been saying is a lot of rubbish" he told a visitor.

== Literature ==
- Gratzer, W. B. 2000. The Undergrowth of Science: Delusion, Self-Deception and Human Frailty. Oxford University Press
- Lepeshinskaya, O. B., 1954. The Origin of Cells from Living Substance. Several editions in several languages.
- Zhinkin L. N. and Mikhaĭlov V. P., 1958. On "The New Cell Theory" Science, New Series, Vol. 128, No. 3317 (Jul. 25, 1958), pp. 182–186
