= List of Russian biologists =

This list of Russian biologists includes the famous biologists from the Russian Federation, the Soviet Union, the Russian Empire and other predecessor states of Russia. Biologists of all specialities may be listed here, including ecologists, botanists, zoologists, paleontologists, biochemists, physiologists and others.

== Alphabetical list ==
=== A ===
- Johann Friedrich Adam, discoverer of the Adams mammoth, the first complete woolly mammoth skeleton
- Igor Akimushkin, biologist
- Vladimir Prokhorovich Amalitskii, paleontologist
- Nicolai Andrusov, paleontologist
- Andrey Avinoff, entomologist
- Anatoly Andriyashev, ichthyologist, zoogeographist

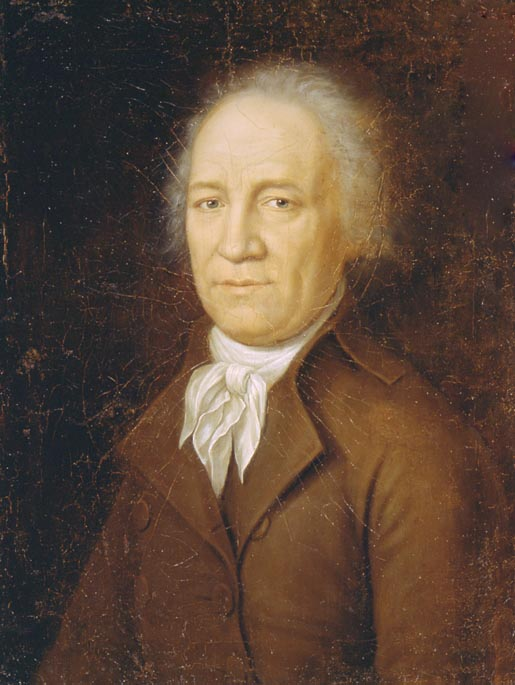
Bolotov

=== B ===
- Karl Ernst von Baer, naturalist, founder of the Russian Entomological Society, formulated embryological Baer's laws
- Alexander Barchenko, notable for his research of Hyperborea
- Jacques von Bedriaga, prominent herpetologist, described Bedriaga's rock lizard and Bedriaga's skink
- Andrey Belozersky, founder of molecular biology
- Dmitry Belyayev, domesticated silver fox
- Lev Berg, ichthyologist of Central Asia and European Russia
- Yuli Berkovich, experimented with seed germination in zero gravity
- Nikolai Bernstein, neurophysiologist, coined the term biomechanics
- Vladimir Betz, discovered giant pyramidal neurons of primary motor cortex
- Anatoli Petrovich Bogdanov, biologist
- Andrey Bolotov, major 18th-century agriculturist, discovered dichogamy, pioneered cross-pollination
- August von Bongard, botanist of Alaska, discoverer of Sitka spruce and red alder
- Antonina Borissova, botanist
- Zinaida Botschantzeva, botanist
- Alexander Bunge, major botanist of Siberia (especially Altai)
- Alexey Bystrow, paleontologist

=== C ===
- Alexander Catsch, medical doctor and radiation biologist
- Mikhail Chailakhyan, researcher of flowering, described the florigen hormone
- Maria Cherkasova, ecologist
- Evgeny Chernikin, biologist
- Feodosy Chernyshov, paleontologist
- Sergei Chetverikov, pioneer of modern evolutionary synthesis
- Pyotr Chikhachyov, naturalist
- Alexander Chizhevsky, founder of heliobiology and modern air ionification

=== D ===
- Ilya Darevsky, biologist
- Nikolay Dubinin, studied the genetic basis of the human individuality in different populations; studied variability and heritability of neuro, and psychodynamic parameters

=== E ===
- Vladimir Efroimson, Soviet geneticist
- Andrey Erst, botanist
- Kirill Eskov, biologist, discovered several new genera of spiders
- Eduard Eversmann, biologist and explorer, pioneer researcher of flora and fauna of southern Russia

=== F ===
- Andrey Famintsyn, plant physiologist, inventor of grow lamp, developer of symbiogenesis theory
- Mikhail A. Fedonkin, paleontologist
- Yuri Filipchenko, entomologist, coined the terms microevolution and macroevolution

=== G ===
- Oleg Gazenko, zoologist
- Johann Georg Gmelin, first researcher of Siberian flora
- Viktor Grebennikov, naturalist and entomologist, claimed to have built a levitation platform by attaching dead insect body parts to the underside
- Ilya Gruzinov, discovered the source for deep vocal sound is the membrane
- Grigory Grum-Grshimailo, zoologist and geographer, obtained two Przewalski's horses and more than 1000 bird specimens from his travels in Central Asia
- Alexander Gurwitsch, originated the morphogenetic field theory and discovered the biophoton

Ivanovsky

=== I ===
- Ilya Ivanov, researcher of artificial insemination and the interspecific hybridization of animals, involved in controversial attempts to create a human-ape hybrid
- Dmitry Ivanovsky, discoverer of viruses

=== J ===
- Hans Johansen, zoologist
- Hermann Johansen, zoologist

=== K ===
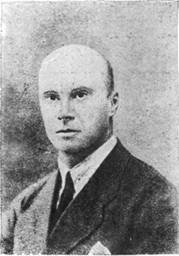
Kozo-Polyansky

- Georgii Karpechenko, inventor of rabbage, an early experimental allopolyploid and non-sterile hybrid obtained through crossbreeding of distant species
- Karl Fedorovich Kessler, zoologist
- Alexander Keyserling, zoologist
- Nikolai Koltsov, discoverer of cytoskeleton
- Vladimir Komarov, plant geographer, President of the Soviet Academy of Sciences, founder of the Komarov Botanical Institute
- Aleksei Alekseevich Korotnev, zoologist
- Alexander Kovalevsky, embryologist, major researcher of gastrulation
- Vladimir Kovalevsky, studied the effect of meteorological, hydrological, and temperature factors on harvest
- Alexey Kondrashov, works on evolutionary genetics. Developed the deterministic mutation hypothesis explaining the maintenance of sexual reproduction, sympatric speciation, and evaluated mutation rates
- Boris Kozo-Polyansky, botanist, and evolutionary biologist. First to support the theory of symbiogenesis with Darwinian evolution, and first director of The B.M. Kozo-Polyansky Botanical Garden of Voronezh State University.
- August David Krohn, pioneer in marine biology and published essential works on Chaetognatha (arrow worms)
- Peter Kropotkin zoologist
- Ludmila Kuprianova, botanist
- Andrei Kursanov, major physiologist and biochemist
- Sergei Kurzanov, paleontologist
- Nikolai Jakovlevice Kusnezov, entomologist

=== L ===
- Alexander Lebedev, known for his work on the biochemical basis of behavior
- Olga Lepeshinskaya, advocate of spontaneous generation
- Ivan Lepyokhin, botanist
- Peter Lesgaft, founder of the modern system of physical education, one of the founders of theoretical anatomy
- Vladimir Ippolitovich Lipsky, botanist
- Dmitry Litvinov, botanist
- Trofim Lysenko, agronomist, developer of yarovization, infamous for lysenkoism

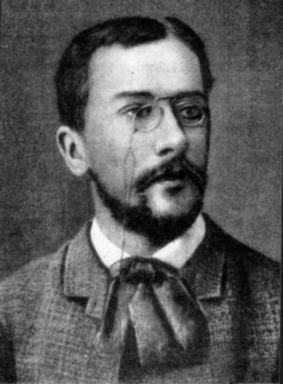
Merezhkovsky

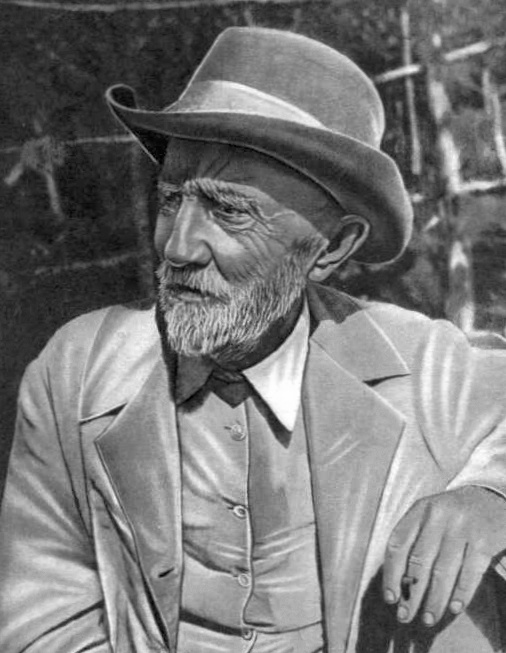
Michurin

=== M ===
- Evgeny Maleev, discoverer of Talarurus, Tarbosaurus, and Therizinosaurus
- Karl Maximovich, pioneer researcher of the Far Eastern flora
- Ilya Mechnikov, pioneer researcher of immune system, probiotics and phagocytosis, coined the term gerontology, Nobel Prize in Medicine winner
- Zhores Medvedev, biologist
- Ivan Vladimirovich Michurin, botanist
- Nicholas Miklouho-Maclay, ethnologist
- Sergei Mirkin, DNA researcher
- Andrey Vasilyevich Martynov, entomologist
- Mikhail Menzbier, major ornithologist, discoverer of the Menzbier's marmot
- Konstantin Merezhkovsky, major lichenologist, developer of symbiogenesis theory, a founder of endosymbiosis theory
- Ivan Michurin, pomologist, selectionist and geneticist, practiced crossing of geographically distant plants, created hundreds of fruit cultivars
- Alexander Middendorf, zoologist and explorer, studied the influence of permafrost on living beings, coined the term "radula", horse breeder
- Victor Motschulsky, coleopterologist (researcher of beetles)
- Dmitrii Mushketov, paleontologist

=== N ===
- Sergei Navashin, discovered double fertilization
- Alexander Mikhailovich Nikolsky, zoologist

=== O ===
- Vladimir Obruchev, paleontologist
- Sergey Ognev, for his work on mammalogy
- Alexey Olovnikov, predicted existence of telomerase, suggested the telomere hypothesis of aging and the telomere relations to cancer
- Aleksandr Oparin, biologist and biochemist, proposed the "primordial soup" theory of life origin, showed that many food production processes are based on biocatalysis
- Yuri Ovchinnikov, proponent of using molecular biology and genetics for creating new types of biological weapons

=== P ===
- Heinz Christian Pander, embryologist, discoverer of germ layers
- Peter Simon Pallas, polymath naturalist and explorer, discoverer of multiple animals, including the Pallas's cat, Pallas's squirrel, and Pallas's gull
- Vladimir Pasechnik, biologist
- Ivan Pavlov, founder of modern physiology, the first to research classical conditioning, Nobel Prize in Medicine winner
- Alexander Petrunkevitch, eminent arachnologist of his time. Described over 130 spider species
- Nikolay Pirogov, founded field surgery. Was one of the first surgeons in Europe to use ether as an anaesthetic
- Vladimir Pravdich-Neminsky, published the first EEG and the evoked potential of the mammalian brain
- Yevgenia Georgievna Pobedimova, botanist and plant collector, notably in Russia, Ukraine and North Asia
- Maria Prokhorova, biologist and physiologist, did a research on gas gangrene during the Great Patriotic War
- Nikolai Przhevalsky, explorer and naturalist, brought vast collections from Central Asia, discovered the only extant species of wild horse

=== R ===
- Tikhon Rabotnov, made ground breaking studies in the regeneration of natural plant communities
- Leonty Ramensky, studied biotic communities
- Alexandr Pavlovich Rasnitsyn, paleontologist
- Anatoly Rozhdestvensky, discoverer of Aralosaurus and Probactrosaurus
- Vasiliy E. Ruzhentsev, paleontologist

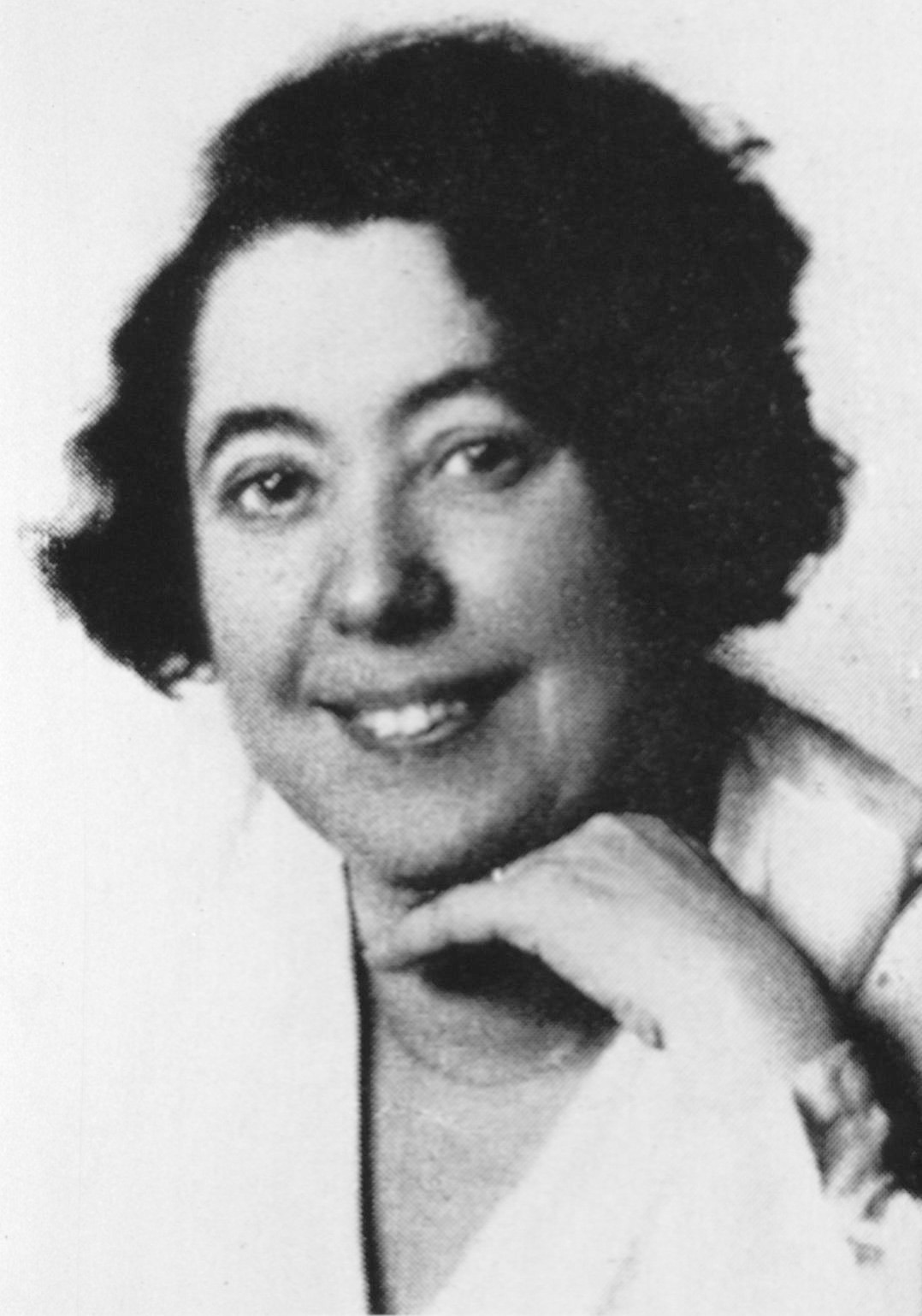
Lina Stern

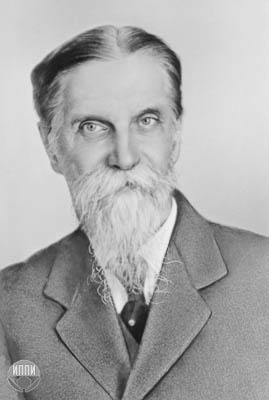
Timiryazev

=== S ===
- Ivan Schmalhausen, developer of modern evolutionary synthesis
- Leopold von Schrenck, ethnographer, zoologist, discovered the Amur sturgeon, Manchurian black water snake and Schrenck's bittern
- Boris Schwanwitsch, entomologist, applied colour patterns of insect wings to military camouflage during World War II
- Ivan Sechenov, founder of electrophysiology and neurophysiology
- Andrey Semyonov-Tyan-Shansky, entomologist
- Aleksandr Grigorevich Sharov, paleontologist
- Vladimir Shevyakov, zoologist, protistologist
- Pyotr Shirshov, hydrobiologist, participant of many arctic expeditions including the first drifting ice station, North Pole-1, researched plankton in polar regions and proved there is life in high altitudes of the Arctic Ocean, founded and headed the Shirshov Institute of Oceanology
- Victor Shmidt, zoologist, leading Russian specialist in microscopic anatomy and embryology
- Aleksandr Aleksandrovich Shmuk, studied the biochemistry of tobacco
- Julian Simashko, zoologist
- Norair Sisakian, biochemist, one of the founders of space biology, pioneer in biochemistry of sub-cell structures and technical biochemistry
- Alexey Skvortsov, botanist
- Boris Sergeyevich Sokolov, paleontologist
- Alexander Spirin, made significant contributions to the biochemistry of nucleic acids, and protein biosynthesis
- Yaroslav Starobogatov, zoologist
- Georg Wilhelm Steller, naturalist, participant of Vitus Bering's voyages, discoverer of Steller's jay, Steller's eider, extinct Steller's sea cow and multiple other animals
- Lina Stern, pioneer researcher of blood–brain barrier and first female full member of the Russian Academy of Sciences
- Vladimir Sukachev, geobotanist

=== T ===
- Armen Takhtajan, developer of Takhtajan system of flowering plant classification, major biogeographer
- Valery Taliev, the founder of concept of the role of man in the spreading of plants during Holocene, geobotanist
- Aleksandr Tikhomirov, zoologist
- Kliment Timiryazev, plant physiologist and evolutionist, major researcher of chlorophyll
- Nikolai Timofeeff-Ressovsky, major researcher of radiation genetics, population genetics, and microevolution
- Vladimir Andreevich Tranzschel, mycologist, expert on rust fungi
- Lev Tsenkovsky, pioneer researcher of the ontogenesis of lower plants and animals
- Mikhail Tsvet, inventor of chromatography
- Mikhail Voronin, major researcher of fungi and plant pathology
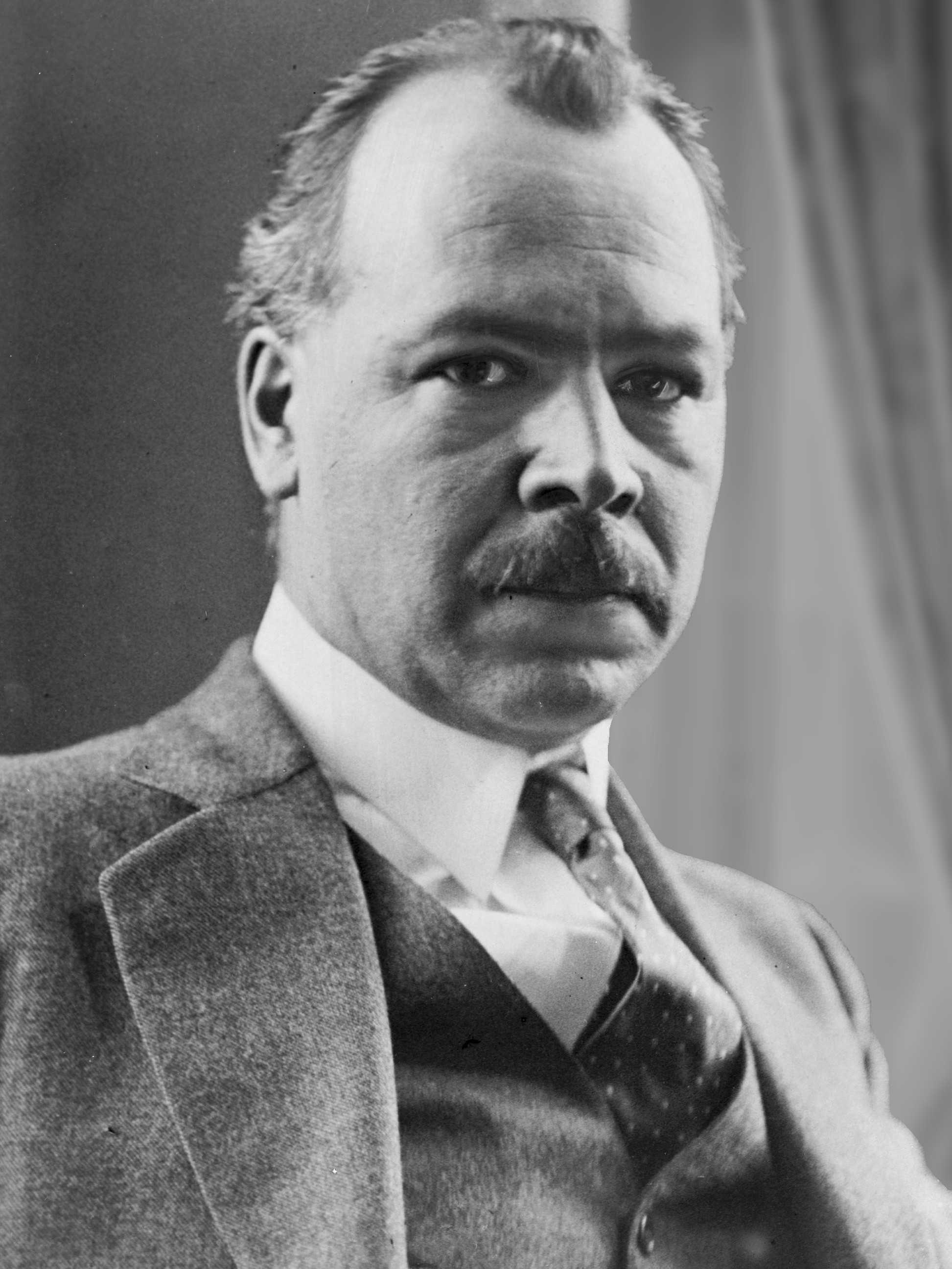
  Vavilov

Vinogradsky

=== V ===
- Nikolai Vavilov, botanist and geneticist, gathered the world's largest collection of plant seeds, identified the centres of origin of main cultivated plants
- Vladimir Vernadsky, founded biogeochemistry, pioneered research into the noosphere
- Olga Vinogradova, accomplished neuroscientist
- Sergey Vinogradsky, microbiologist, ecologist, and soil scientist, pioneered the biogeochemical cycle concept, discovered lithotrophy and chemosynthesis, invented the Winogradsky column for breeding of microorganisms
- Roman Vishniac, biologist

=== W ===
- Sergei Winogradsky, microbiologist, ecologist and soil scientist who pioneered the cycle of life concept

=== Y ===
- Gennady Yakovlev, botanist
- Ivan Yefremov, paleontologist, sci-fi author, founded taphonomy

=== Z ===
- Sviatoslav Zabelin, biologist, awarded the Goldman Environmental Prize
- Sergey Zimov, creator of the Pleistocene Park
- Nikolai Zograf, zoologist
- Valeriy Zyuganov, formulated the concept of freshwater pearl mussel - Atlantic salmon symbiosis

== See also ==
- Bibliography of science and technology in Russia and the Soviet Union
- List of biologists
- List of Russian physicians and psychologists
- List of Russian explorers
- List of Russian Earth scientists
- List of Russian scientists
- Science and technology in Russia
