= Grebennikov =

Grebennikov (Russian: Гребенников) is a Russian masculine surname, its feminine counterpart is Grebennikova. It may refer to

- Alla Grebennikova (born 1949), Russian swimmer
- Jenia Grebennikov (born 1990), French volleyball player of Russian origin
- Roman Grebennikov (born 1975), Russian politician
- Viktor Grebennikov (1927–2001), Russian scientist, naturalist, entomologist and paranormal researcher
- Vladimir Grebennikov (1932–1992), Russian ice hockey player
