= Serge Ivanoff =

Russian painter

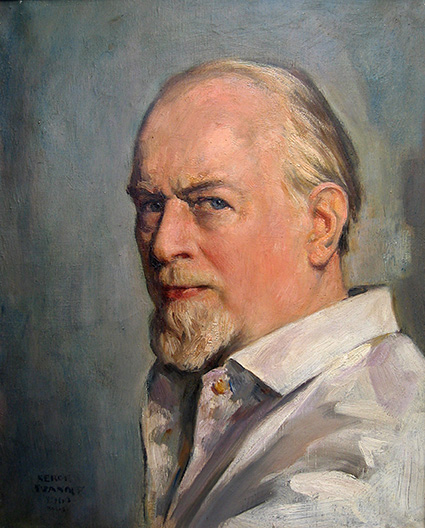
Self-portrait, 1960

Serge Petrovitch Ivanoff (25 December 1893, Moscow – 8 February 1983, Paris) was a French painter of Russian origin.

== Biography ==
The son of a family of Muscovite merchants, Serge Ivanoff was artistic from a young age. On his parents' move to St. Petersburg he took he took classes there at the Saint Petersburg Academy of Sciences (today Russian Academy of Sciences), in particular the lectures and laboratory work of Professor Schmidt on human anatomy. Here he made his first contacts with Europe, through trips to Switzerland and Norway. Then came the war, during which he was mobilized as a gunner.

In 1917, while the Russian Revolution raged, he entered what was then the Higher Arts College of Painting, Sculpture and Architecture at the Imperial Academy of Arts (which was to become, by 1992, the I.E. Repin St. Petersburg State Academic Institute of Painting, Sculpture and Architecture, subordinated within the Russian Academy of Arts).

Aged 24, he entered the Imperial Academy of Arts and perfected his art under the benevolent direction of Master Braz, curator of the Hermitage Museum in Saint Petersburg. He then went to Professor Kardovsky's class and finished his studies at the Academy with competitive work in 1922. This was the first promotion of this order during the Bolshevik revolution. All contact with Europe had been cut off and study trips abroad were no longer available for students of the Academy. In 1920, his wife, with their two children, fled the Bolsheviks to Paris. Two years later, having finished his studies and forever marked by the horrors of the revolution, Serge joined them in Paris.

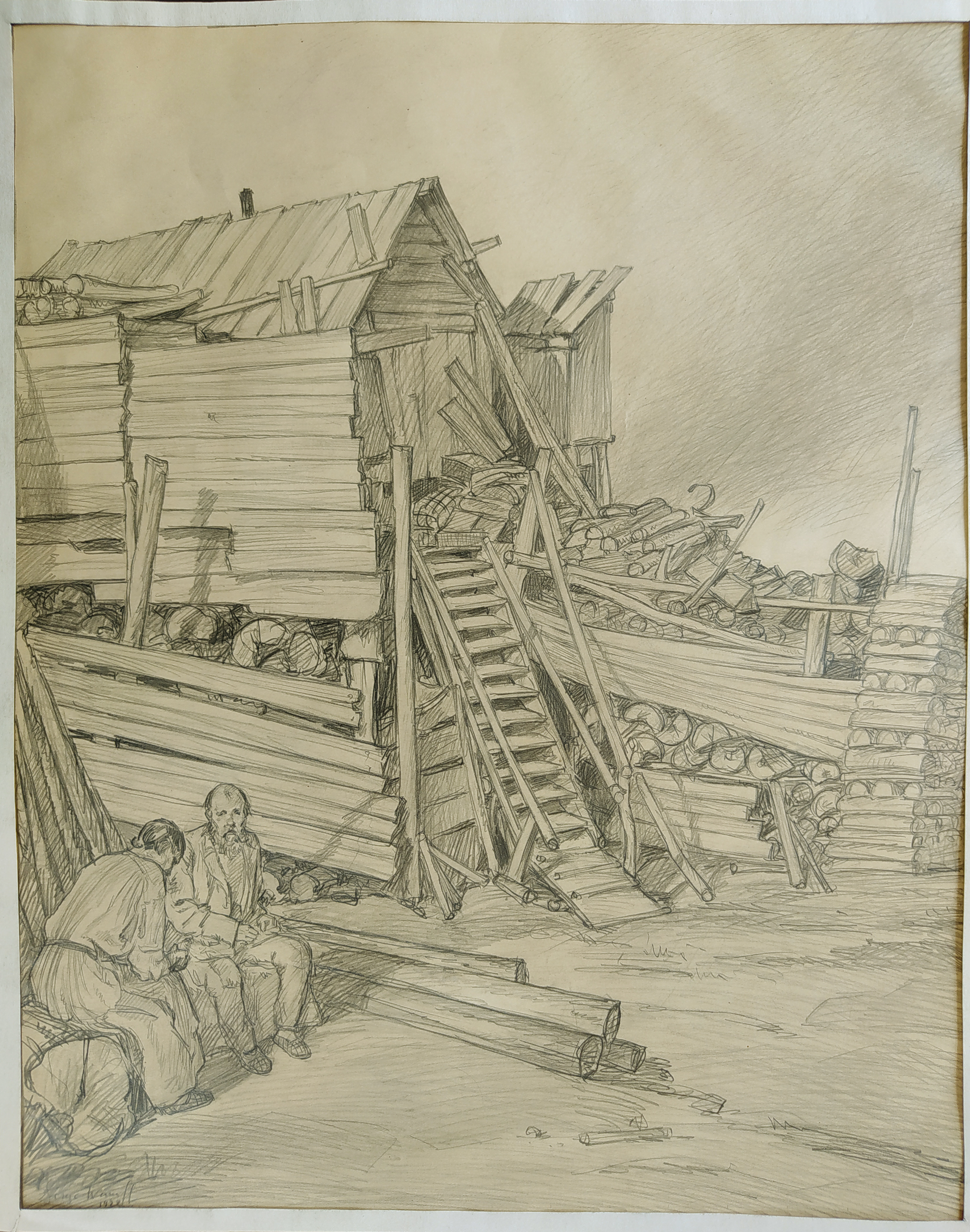
Maison de pêcheurs sur la Volga, Serge Ivanoff, 1922

Before leaving, he travelled discreetly through the Russian countryside to document his impressions of the Russian countryside. On his way, he was welcomed by Ilya Repin in his dacha at Kuokkala, before crossing Finland by foot.

Finally it is to Paris, via England, that his steps lead him. He had a small testimonial book published there: "La famine en Russie Bolchévique", in which he illustrated a poignant text with his rigorous drawings.

Finally exiled, he created book illustrations, posters and advertisements to earn a living, while in the mean time continuing his artistic research. Traveling through the main cities of Europe, he established a solid reputation as a portrait painter. From 1930 to 1950, he collaborated with the magazine L'Illustration and, as such, he once again traveled the world: Italy, Denmark, Holland, Belgium, Brazil.

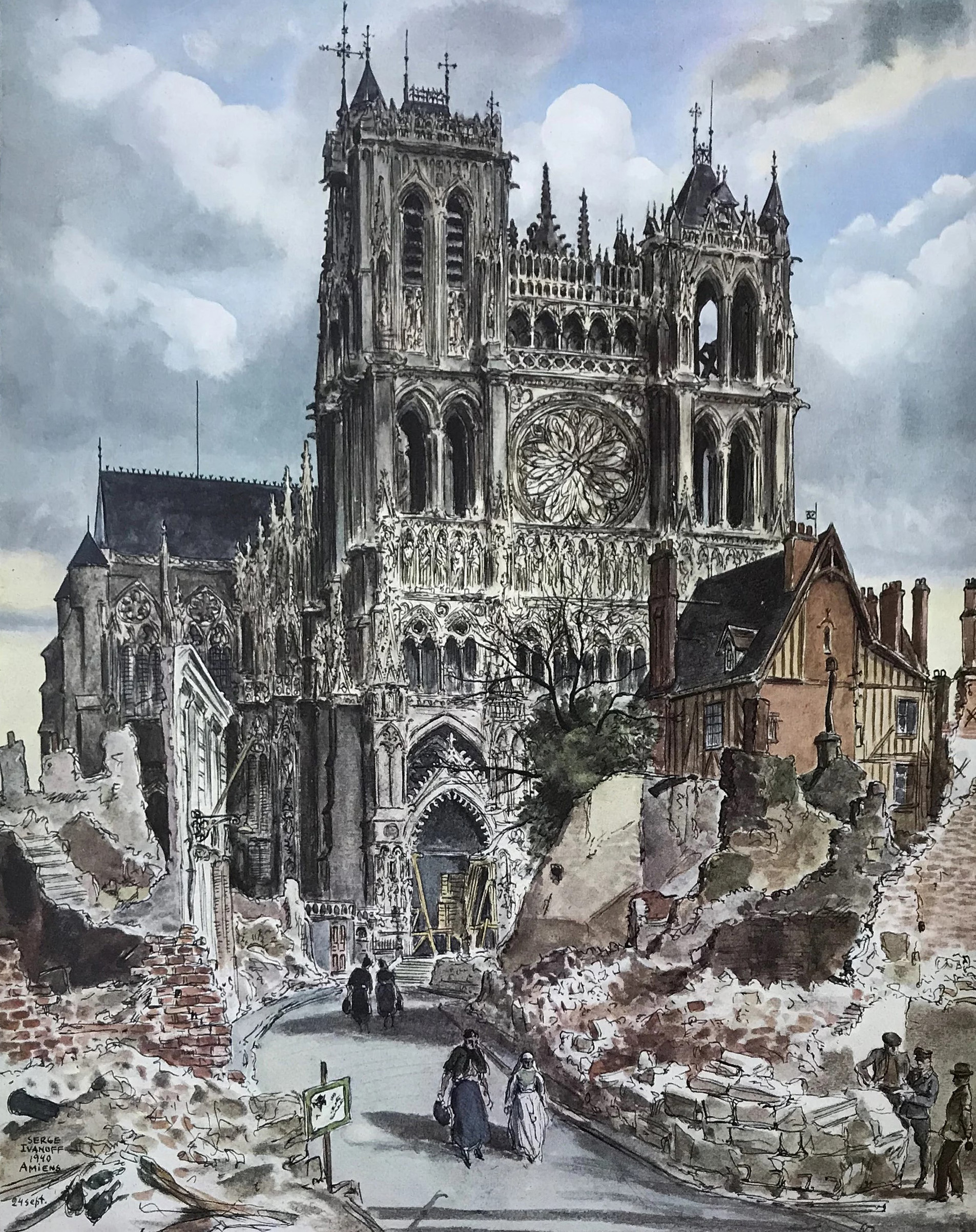
Cathédrale d'Amiens par Serge Ivanoff, 1940.

He produced reportage drawings, such as these series of paintings representing the Hôtel Drouot or these watercolors presenting the Cathedrals of France, of which the Musée Carnavalet acquired several pieces in 1988. He designs stage costumes and theater sets. His Haute couture representations (Schiaparelli, Molyneux, Rochas, Patou) made the cover of fashion magazines. Van Cleef & Arpels commissioned a portrait from him for the New York Exhibition in 1939, depicting a model wearing jewelry from the "Passe-Partout" collection.

He met several notable figures of the period. His work as an illustrator allowed him to pursue personal artistic interests, exploring classical themes through mythological scenes, genre paintings, and still lifes.

In 1937, L'Illustration asked Serge Ivanoff to do a painting report illustrating the interiors of the Vatican. This trip was an important turning point for him for several reasons. First of all, the familiarization with the great masters of the past of the Italian school, then the beginning of a career as a portraitist of prelates of the Catholic Church. In Rome the artist made the decisive encounter with Vyacheslav Ivanov, a major figure of the Silver Age. The philosopher made him aware of his intimate creative power, which would later allow him to deepen his personal path.

After the Second World War, he developed his international career in Brazil and then in Argentina. The South American continent inspires his style with greater freedom of touch and boldness in color. At the same time, he earned a great reputation as a portraitist, which followed him beyond borders.

In 1950, Ivanoff moved to the United States; one year later he became an honorary citizen. For over a decade he traveled across the American continent, executing many portraits.

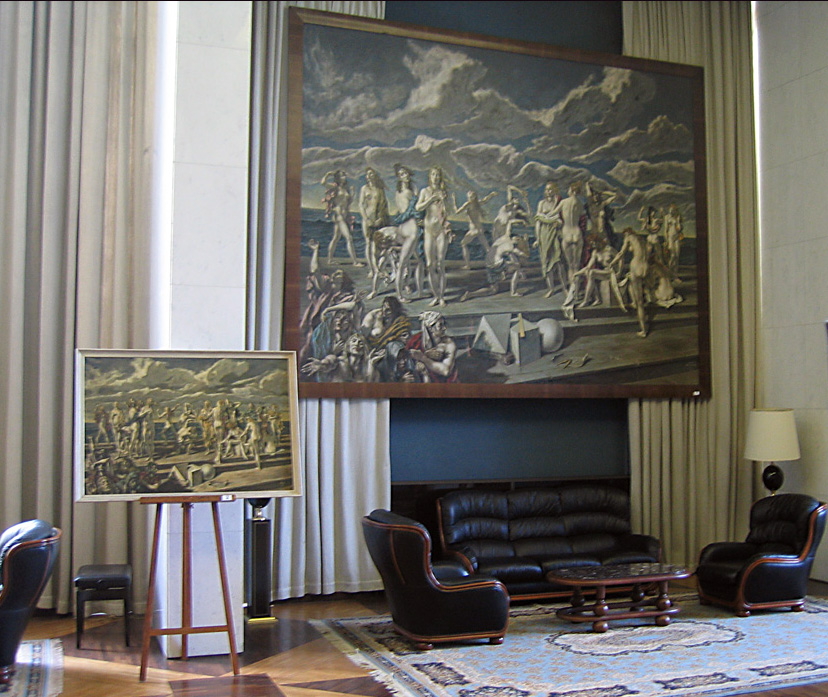
Exposition du tableau "Menaces" à Ambassade de Russie à Paris en 2006.

At the end of the 1960s, he returned permanently to France and set up his studio at 80 Rue Taitbout, in Paris. He was a member of the Salon des Indépendants. In 1965, France's first Minister of Cultural Affairs, André Malraux, awarded him a gold medal for his painting "Menaces" (Threats). This painting is now in the collection of the Russian Embassy in Paris (donated by the Ivanoff family on the death of the artist).

His grandson Alexandre Barbera-Ivanoff, born in 1973, is also a renowned painter. He is the only expert empowered by the Ivanoff family to authenticate Serge Ivanoff's works.

== Talented portraitist, he painted or drew the portrait of many well-known figures ==
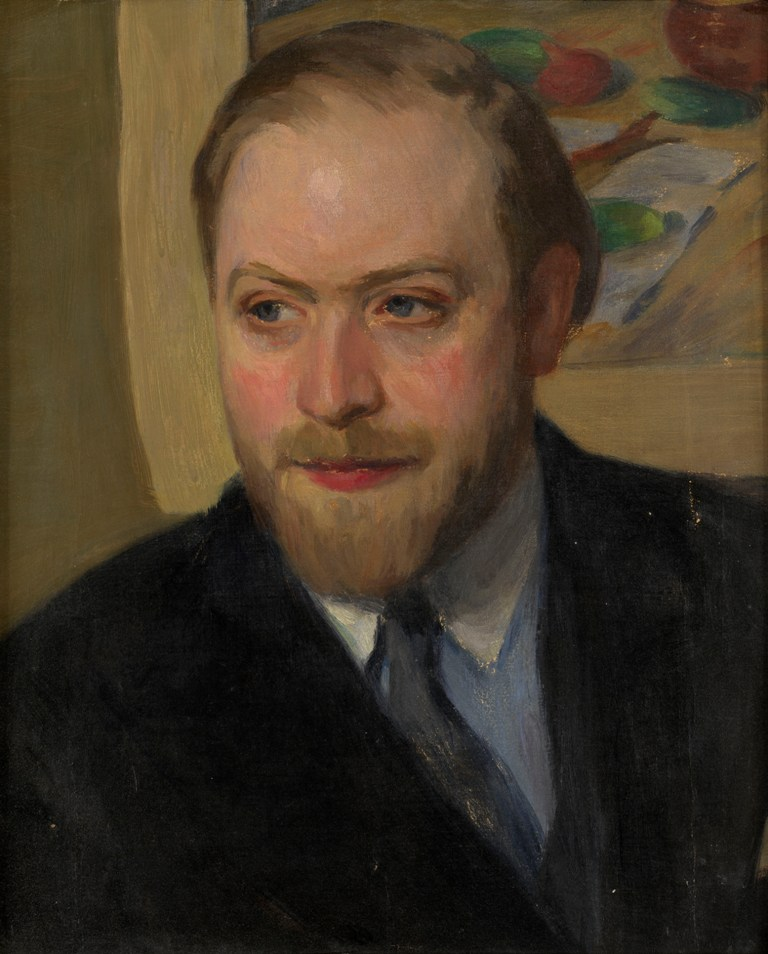
Portrait of Serge Ivanoff by Osip Braz

- Grand Duke Vladimir Kirillovich of Russia, Paris, 1944
- Vyacheslav Ivanov, Rome, 1937 (collection of the Centre de recherche V. Ivanov at Rome)
- Alexandre Benois, 1944 (Russian Museum collection)
- Osip Braz, Paris, 1933. Braz, for his part, painted the portrait of Serge Ivanoff.
- Zinaida Serebriakova, Paris, 1940 (Collection K. Serebriakova). Serebriakova in return painted Sergei Ivanoff's portrait. His son, Alexandre Serebriakoff, painted a watercolor artwork representing the studio of Serge Ivanoff (Paris, 1944).
- Natalia Goncharova, Paris, 1960. (Russian Museum collection)
- Nicholas Kalmakoff, Paris, 1929
- Boris Riabouchine, Paris, 1962 (Russian Museum collection)
- Yury Annenkov
- Boris Zaytsev
- Arthur Honegger
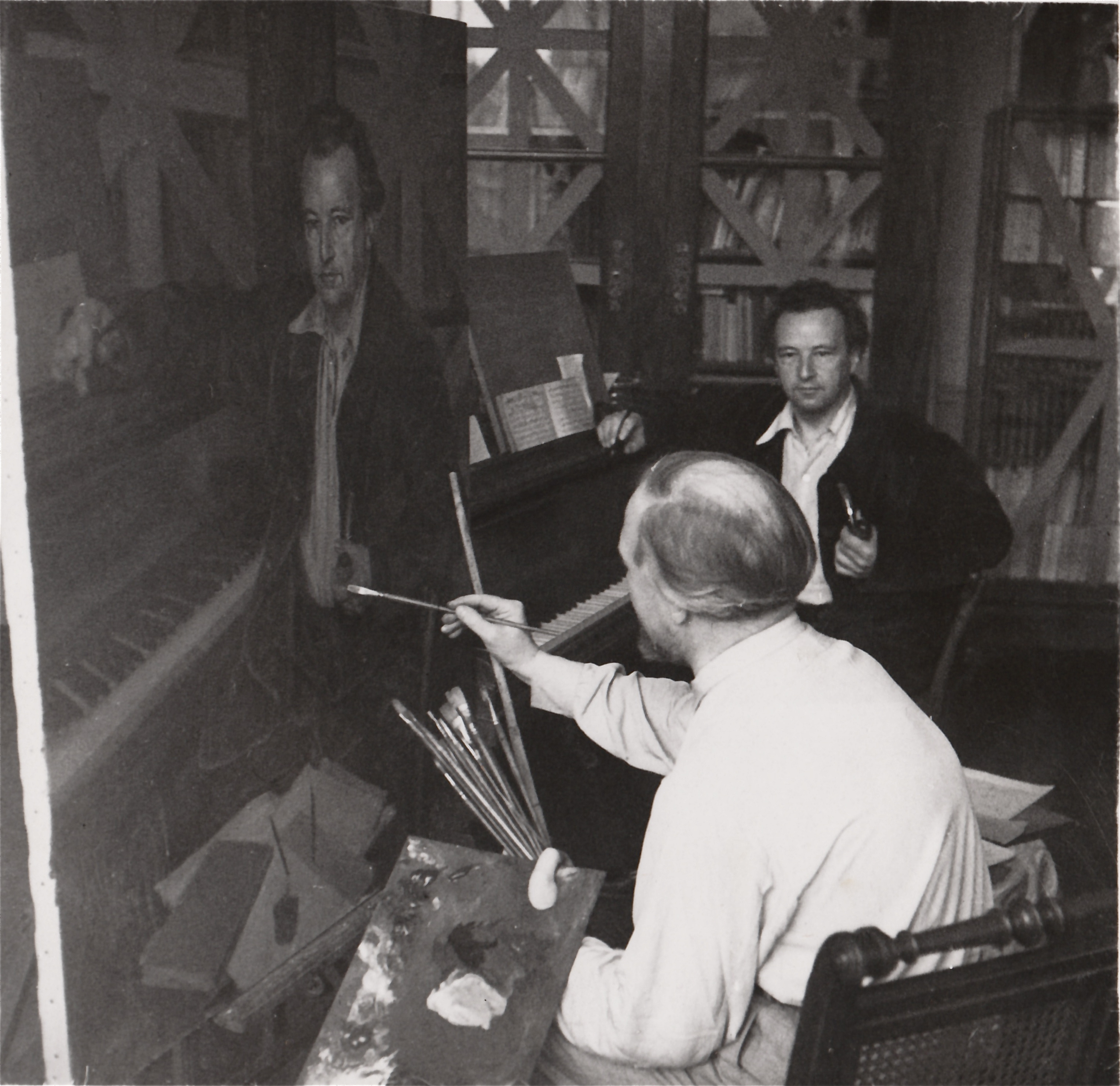
  Serge Ivanoff peint le portrait d'Arthur Honegger. Paris, 1944.
  , Paris, 1944. The portrait was exhibited in 1954 in San Francisco, Palace of the Legion of Honor.
- Edwige Feuillère in the role of La Dame aux Camélias, Paris, 1943
- Danielle Darrieux, 1942
- María Casares, Paris, 1947
- Clara Tambour, singer and French actress
- Myriam Colombi, Paris, 1982 (his last portrait on commission before his death)
- Maggy Rouff (Marguerite de Wagner), Paris, 1948

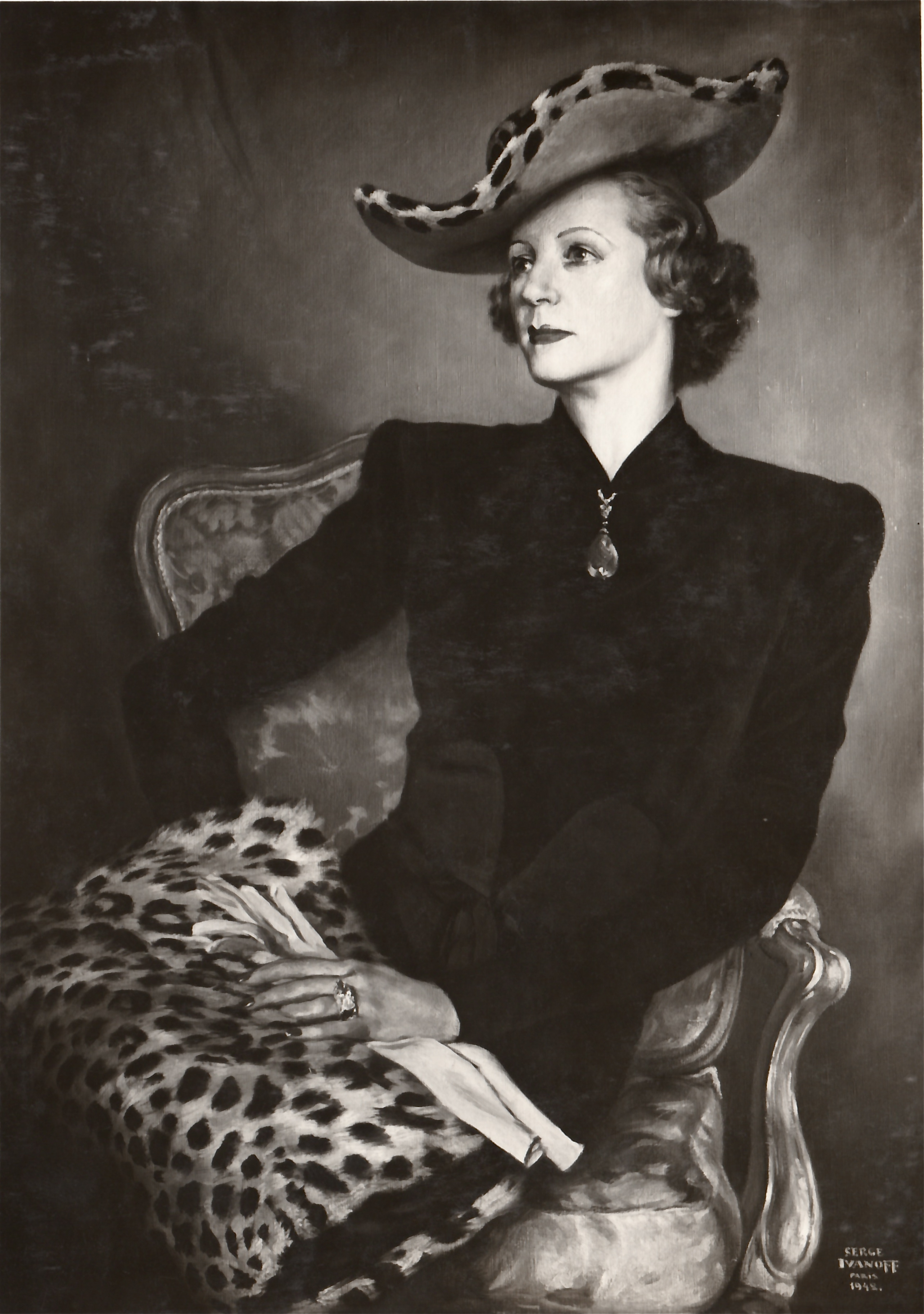
Portrait de Maggy Rouff, Paris, 1948

- Jacques Fath
- Olga Boznańska, Paris, 1929
- Charles Guérin, Paris, 1929
- Gustave Alaux, painter
- François Cogné, Paris, 1945. The sculptor made the same year the bronze bust of Serge Ivanoff.
- Paul Valéry
- Maurice Rostand, Paris, 1942
- Anatole France
- Paul Léautaud
- Bettina von Arnim
- Arshag Chobanian, Paris, 1943. (Musée Arménien de France collection)
- Romuald Szramkiewicz, French jurist
- Franz von Wolff-Metternich
- João Neves da Fontoura, Rio de Janeiro, 1948
- Lord Dunsany, San Francisco, 1953
- Sarvepalli Radhakrishnan, 1953
- Jefferson Caffery and portrait of his wife Gertrude McCarthy, Paris, 1946
- Irina Belotelkin, American designer and artist
- Mildred Anna Williams (Colored pencils, collection Legion of Honor, Fine Arts Museums of San Francisco)
- H.K.S.W. Williams (Colored pencils, collection Legion of Honor, Fine Arts Museums of San Francisco)
- Moore S. Achenbach, ink, 1957 (Collection Legion of Honor, Fine Arts Museums of San Francisco)
- Herman Flax, San Francisco, 1954
- Prince Nicholas Tchkotoua and portrait of his wife, Princess Carol Tchkotoua (née Marmon), San Francisco, 1953
- Sam Rayburn, 1958

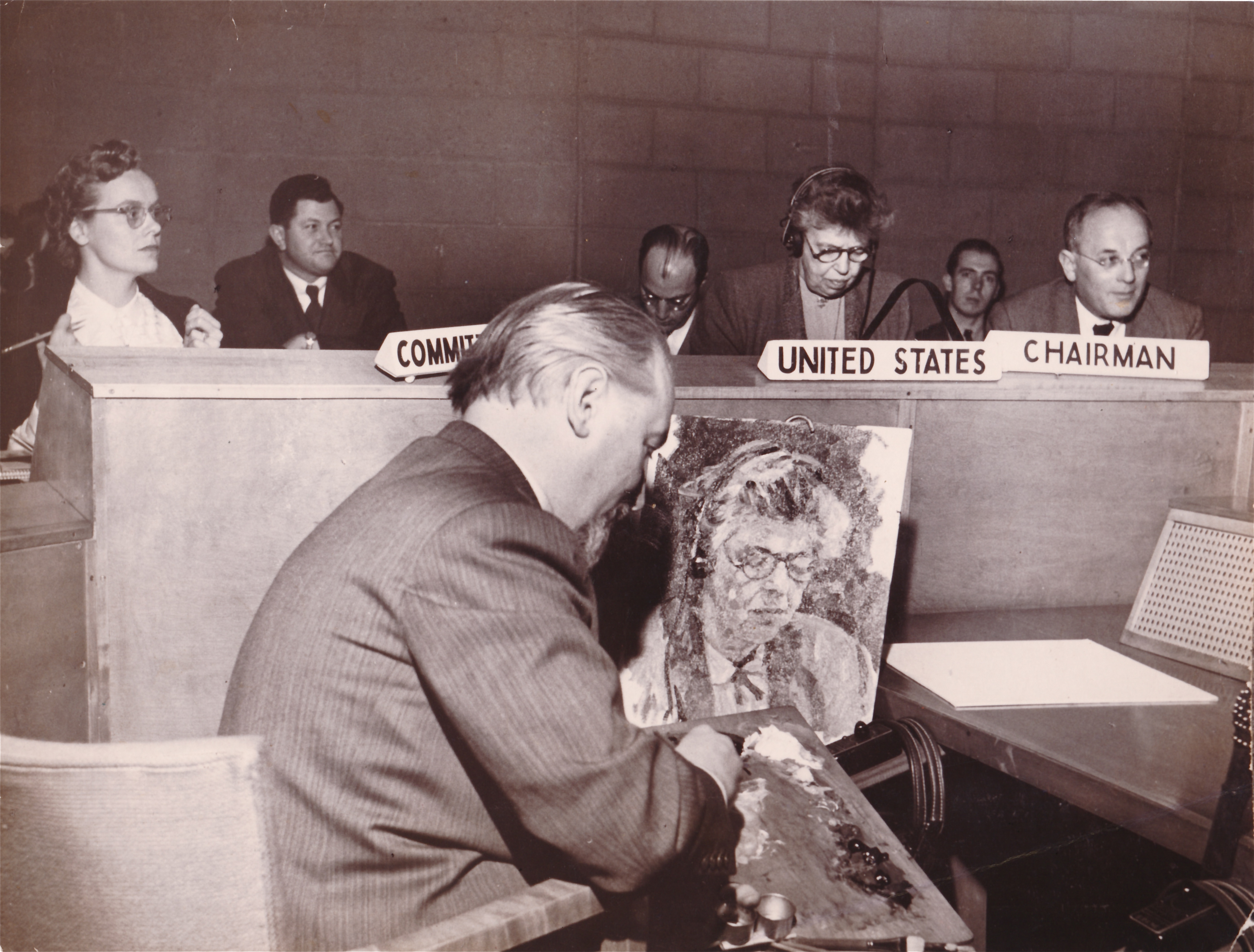
Serge Ivanoff et Eleanor Roosevelt. Lake Success, 1950.

- Eleanor Roosevelt, painting on the spot at a conference of the UN, Lake Success, May 1950

== At the Paris Opera he creates portraits of dancers of the time, in stage costumes ==
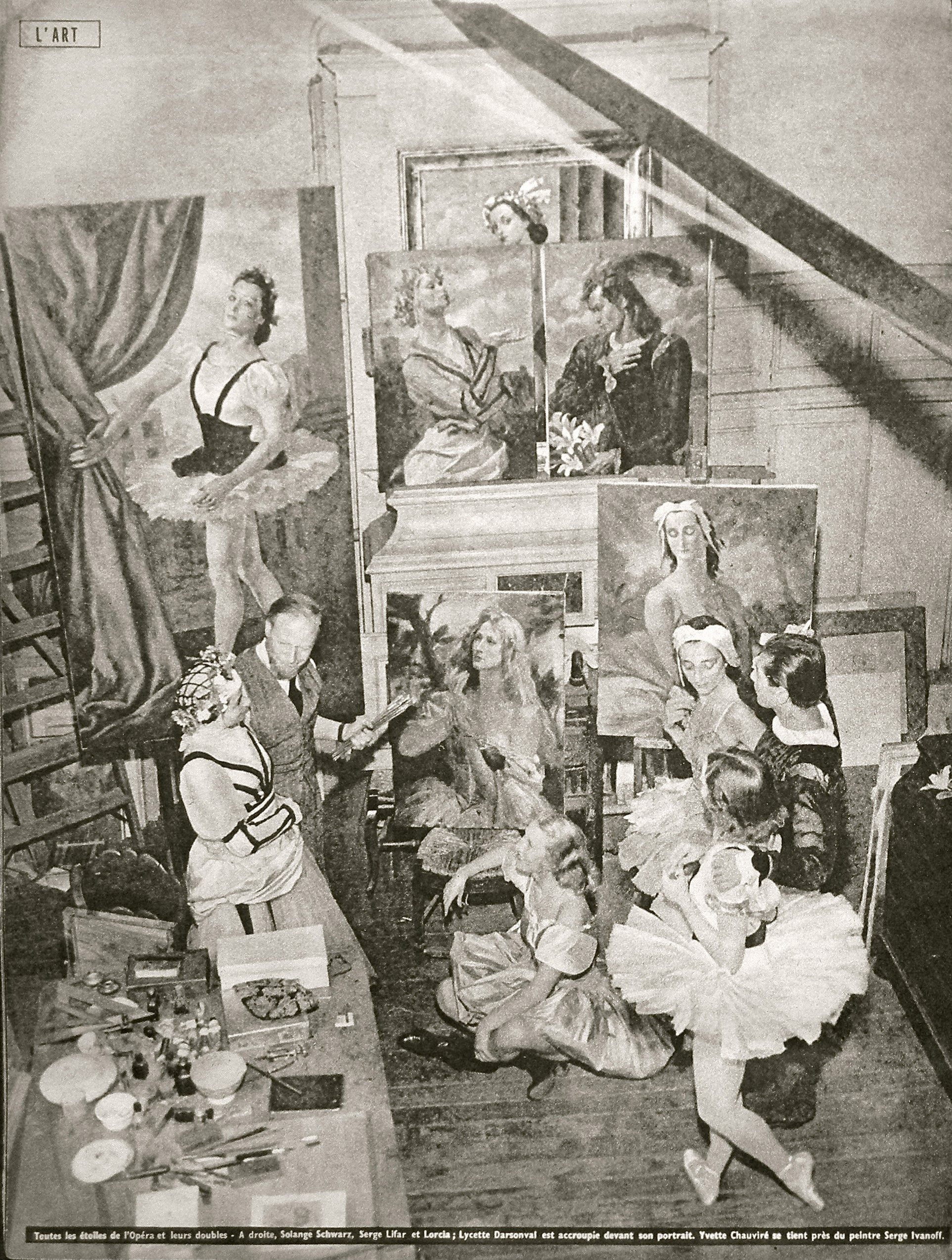
The painter Serge Ivanoff in his studio with his models, dancers at the Paris Opera, November 1941

- Serge Lifar as the romantic Prince Albert from the ballet Giselle, Paris, 1941.
- Lycette Darsonval as Giselle, Paris, 1941. Work exhibited in 1986 at New York, Main Gallery: "Three Centuries of the Paris Opera Ballet".
- Serge Peretti, first man to receive title of Danseur étoile in Giselle, 1941
- José Torres, Spanish dancer and choreographer, Paris, 1965
- Marianne Ivanoff (daughter of Serge Ivanoff wife of José Torres), Paris, 1932
- Yvette Chauviré, the noble lady of the "Chevalier et la Damoiselle", Serge Lifar's latest ballet., Paris, 1941 and a second portrait in 1944.
- Solange Schwarz as Coppélia, Paris, 1940
- Suzanne Lorcia, dressed as Princess of the Swan Lake
- Sacha Lyo, Paris, 1932
- Marcelle Bourgat (Brigitte Bardot's dance teacher), portrait as Gioconda, Paris, 1941
- Ghislaine Thesmar, Paris, 1976

== Serge Ivanoff painted many portraits of ecclesiastics ==
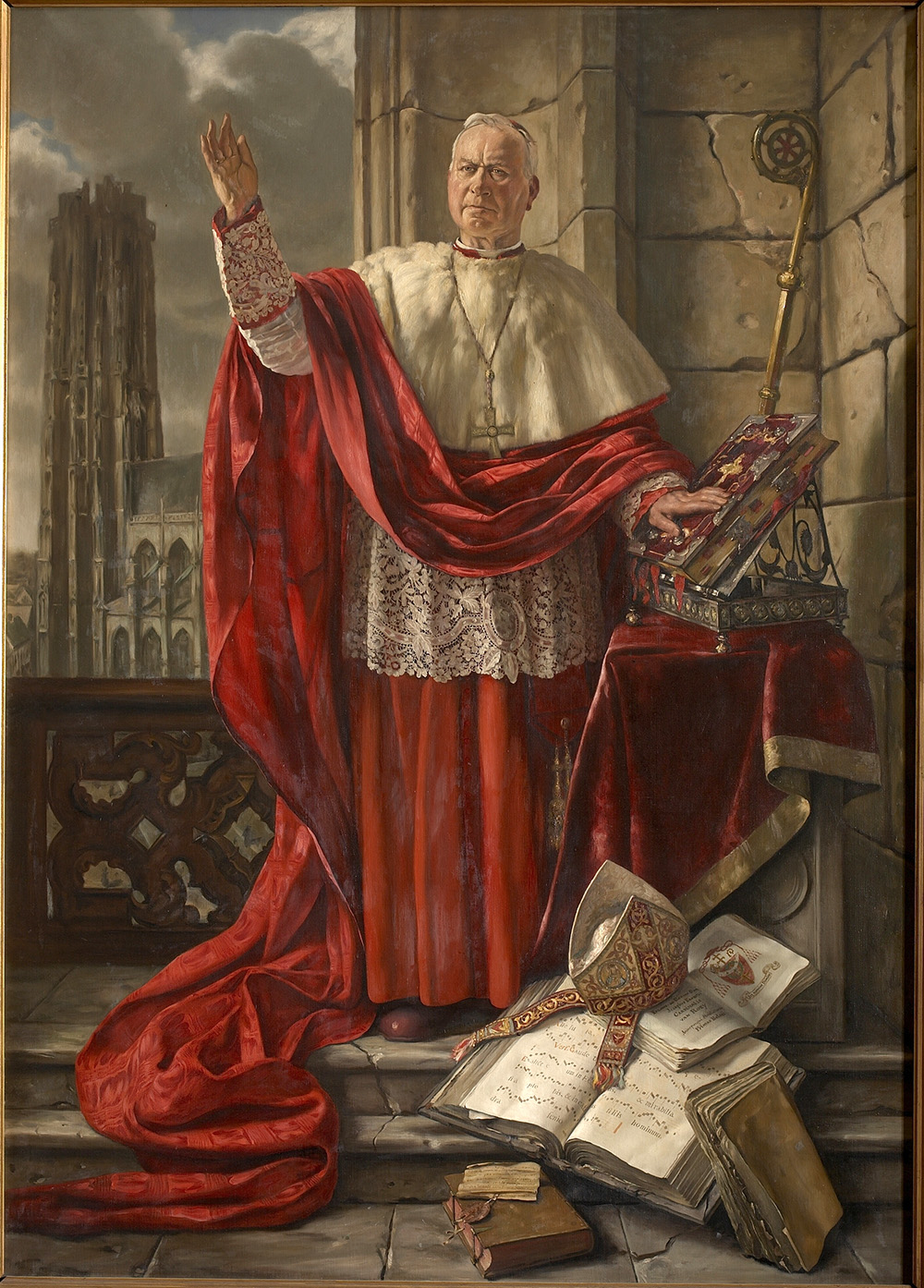
Portrait of Mgr Van Roey by Serge Ivanoff, 1944

- Pope Pius XI, at Castel Gandolfo, 1937. The portrait will appear on the front cover of L'Illustration in a special album on the death of the pope, in February 1939. The pope, though sick and tired, posed for the preparatory portrait.

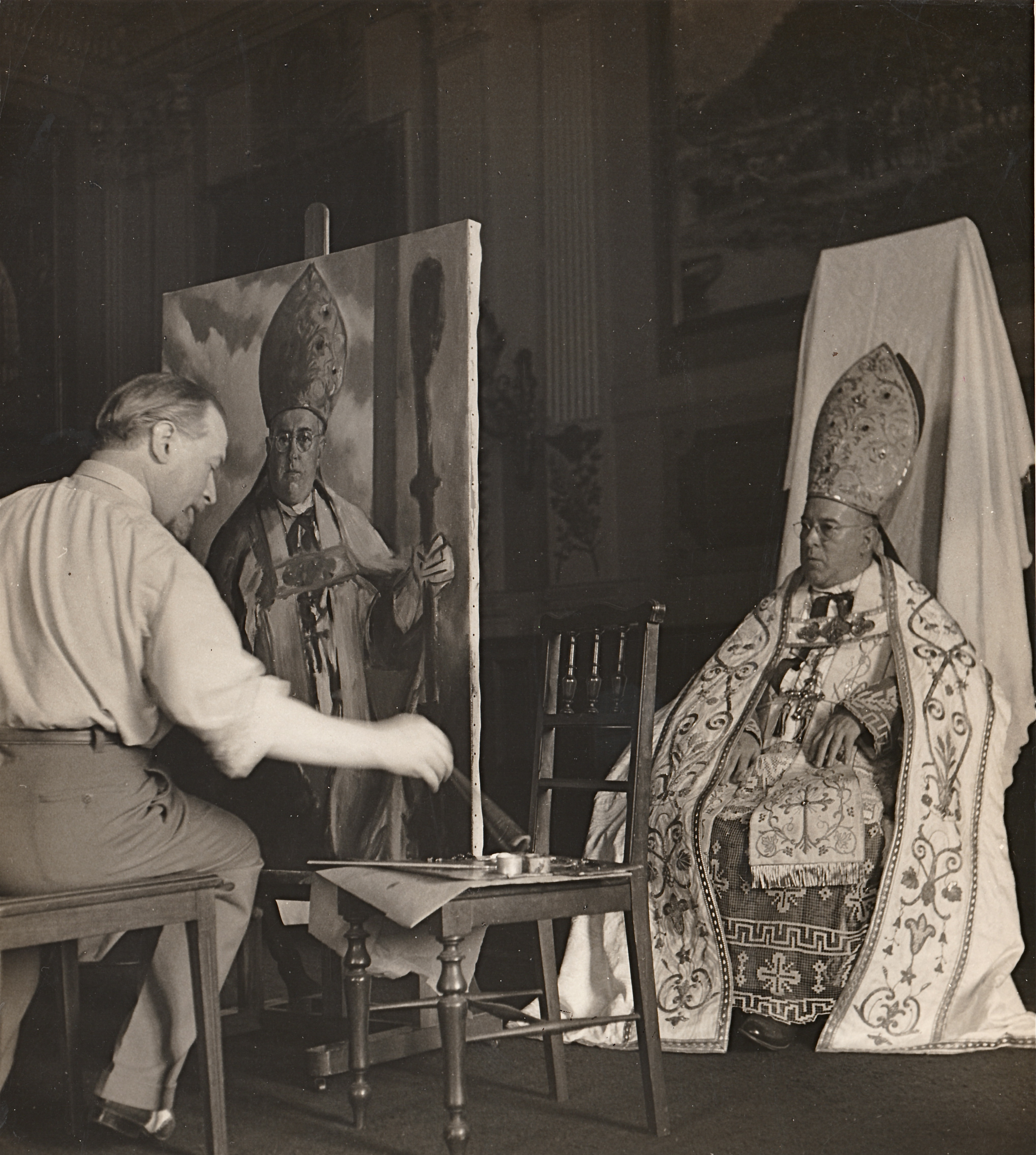
Jaime de Barros Câmara sitting for his portrait by Serge Ivanoff, 1947

- Cardinal Van Roey, 1944
- Mgr Harscouët, bishops of Chartres, 1943 (The portrait can still be found today in the premises of the Chartres Cathedral)
- Cardinal Verdier on his deathbed, 1940
- Raymond Léopold Bruckberger
- Cardinal Canali
- Cardinal Tisserant
- Cardinal Mariani
- Cardinal Tedeschini
- Cardinal Jaime de Barros Câmara, Brazil, 1947

He also paints paintings of the interiors of the pontifical apartments.

== Elaboration of intimate works ==
In parallel with his portrait commissions and his work as an illustrator and decorator, Serge Ivanoff never ceases to pursue his research into several dimensions of painting. During his travels in South America, he explored mythological themes, but using a much brighter color palette. The result was large-scale compositions, scenes of nude women in ancient landscapes. His touch is apparent and spontaneous.

Then came the North American period. Gradually, his palette began to take on a specific range of blue-gray hues, which he would continue to vary and deepen until his death.

Returning to France in the 60s, he applied his palette to a wide range of religious and intimate themes, Parisian interiors, female nudes, erotic scenes and enigmatic mythological scenes.

Gallery

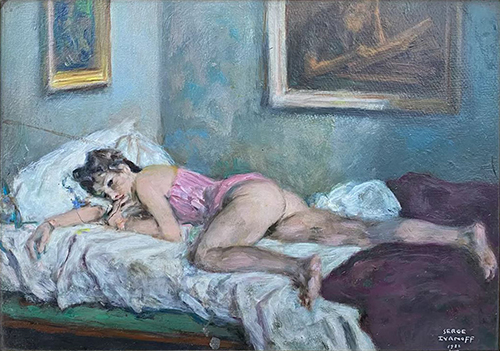
Reclining nude (1982)

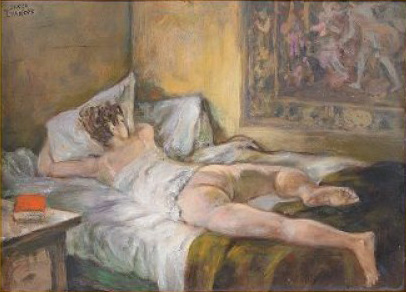
Reclining nude (undated)

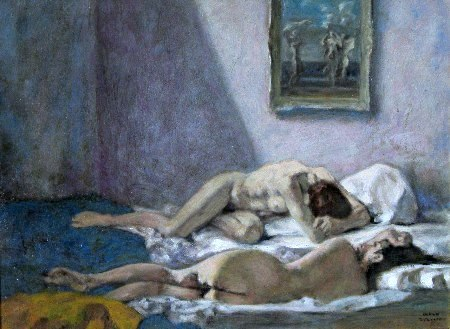
Two women reclining on a bed

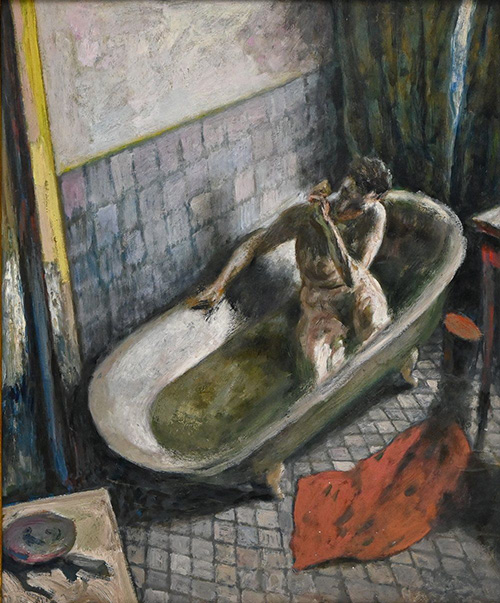
Woman bathing

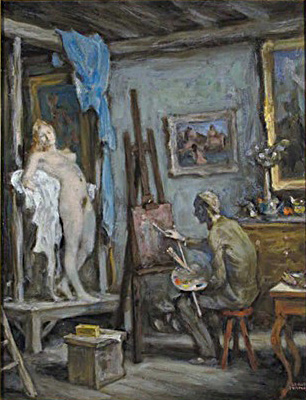
The painter and his model

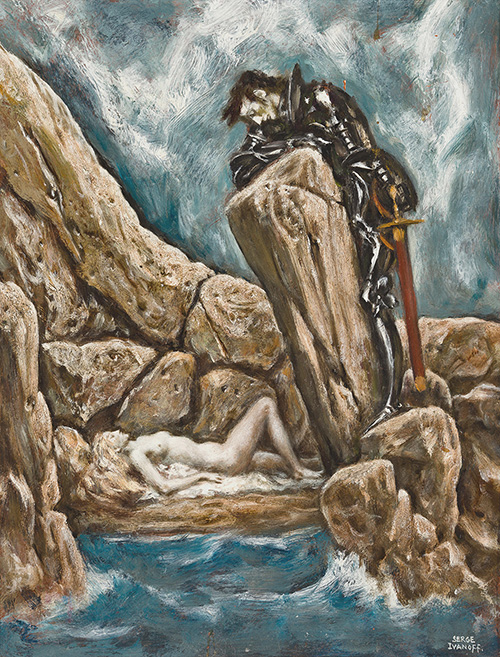
The knight and the maiden

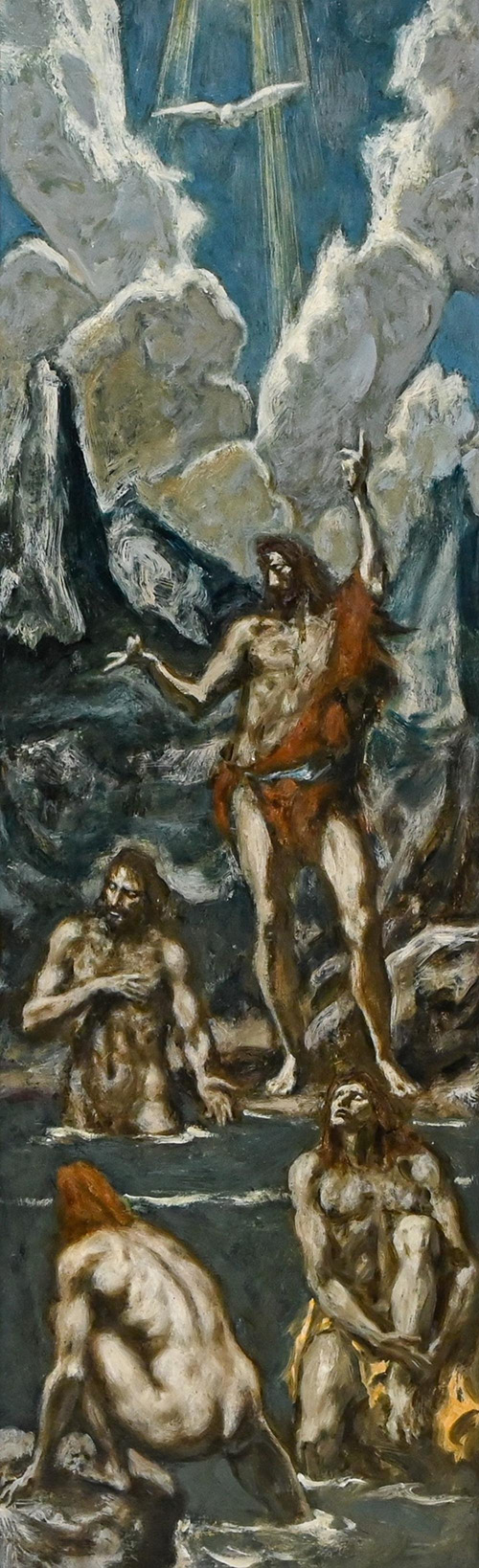
The Baptism of Christ

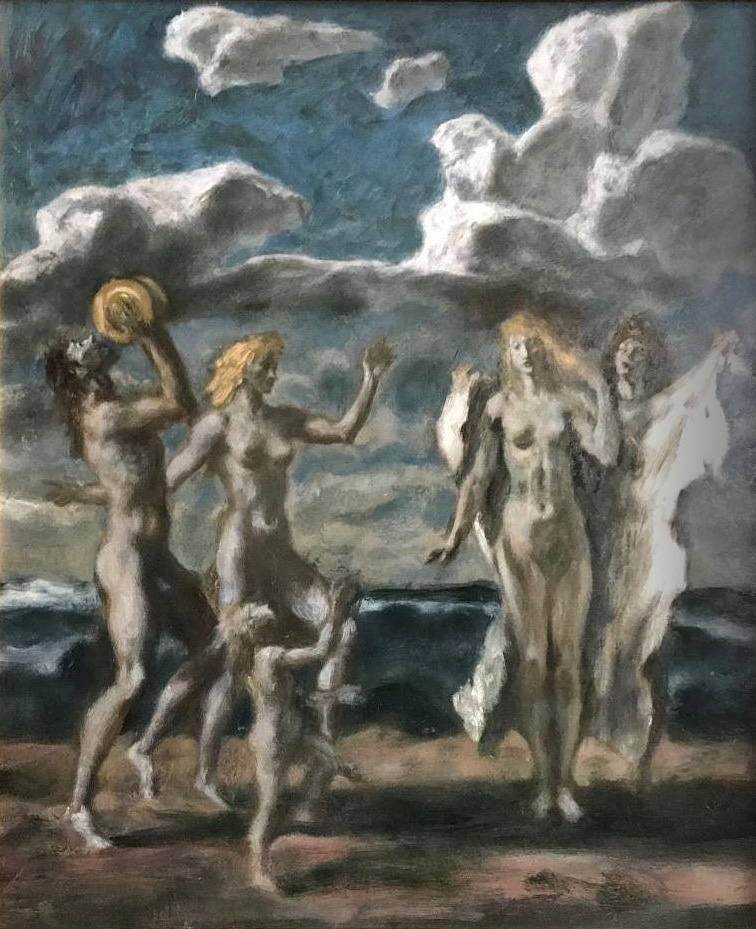
Mythological scene

== Book Illustrations ==
- Les Diaboliques, Barbey d'Aurevilly, Simon Kra, Paris, 1925
- Petits Poèmes en prose, Charles Baudelaire, Javal et Bourdeaux 1933
- Le hasard au coin du feu, Crebillon, 1934
- Tristan and Iseult, Joseph Bédier, 1960
- Michel Strogoff, Jules Verne, Maurice Gonon, 1962
- Tartuffe & Le Bourgeois gentilhomme, Molière, Limited Éditions Club, NY 1963

== Bibliography ==
- La Famine en Russie Bolcheviste, written testimony by Serge Ivanoff, illustrated with 31 drawings by the author. Nouvelle Librairie Nationale, Paris, 1924
- Serge Ivanoff, Ambassade de Russie à Paris - Catalog of the exhibition, May 2006.
