= Myriam Colombi =

French actress (1940–2021)

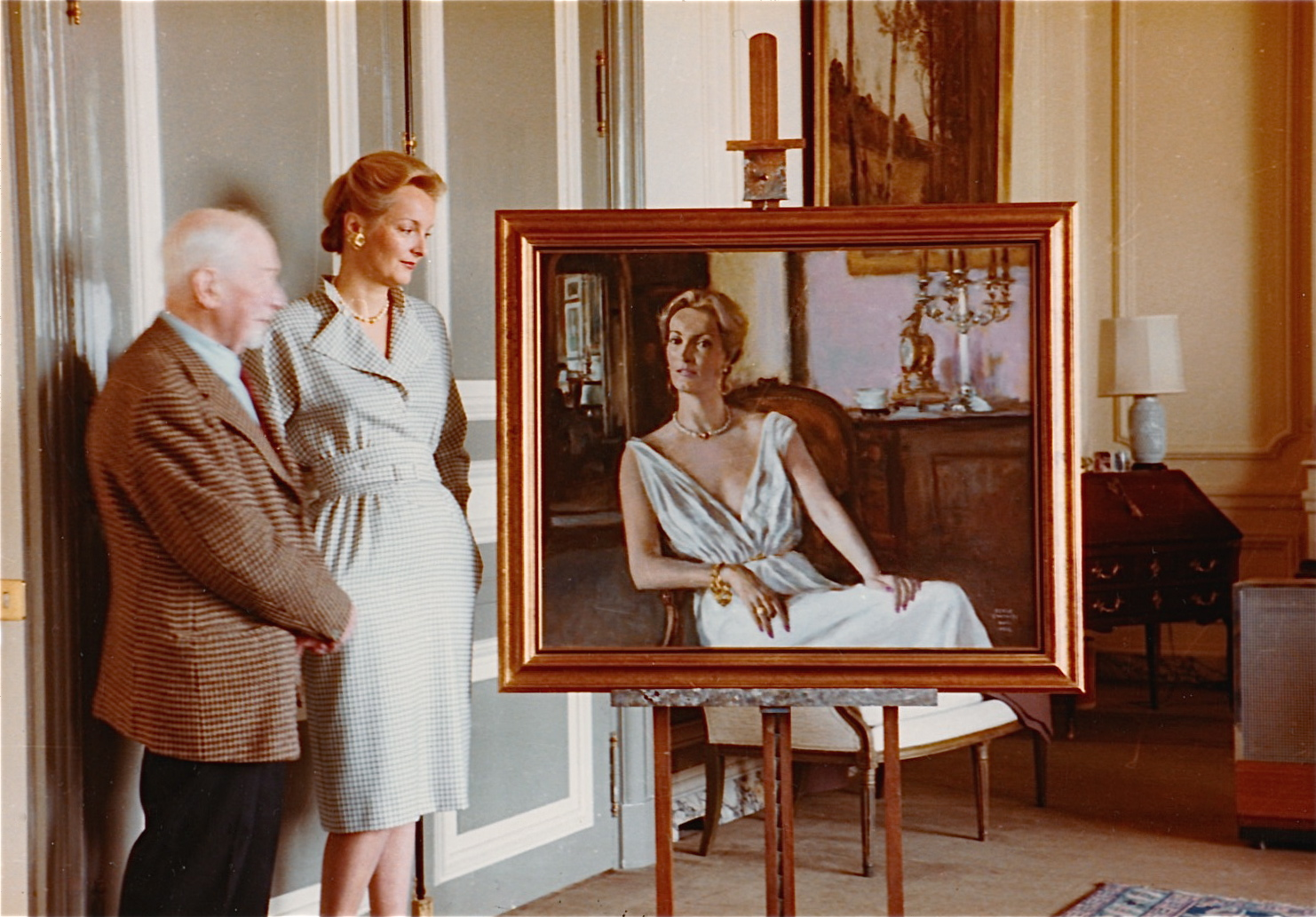
- Myriam Colombi and Serge Ivanoff, Paris, 1982
- Born: Myriam Feune de Colombi; February 23 1940; La Carneille
- Died: April 21, 2021 (aged 81); Neuilly-sur-Seine
- Education: Conservatoire national supérieur d'art dramatique
- Occupation: Actress
- Organization: Theatre director of the Théâtre Montparnasse

Myriam Colombi (23 February 1940 – 21 April 2021) was a French film, television and stage actress. She was theatre director of the Théâtre Montparnasse.

She was married to Jean-Louis Vilgrain from 1977 until her death.
