= Alexandre Barbera-Ivanoff =

French artist

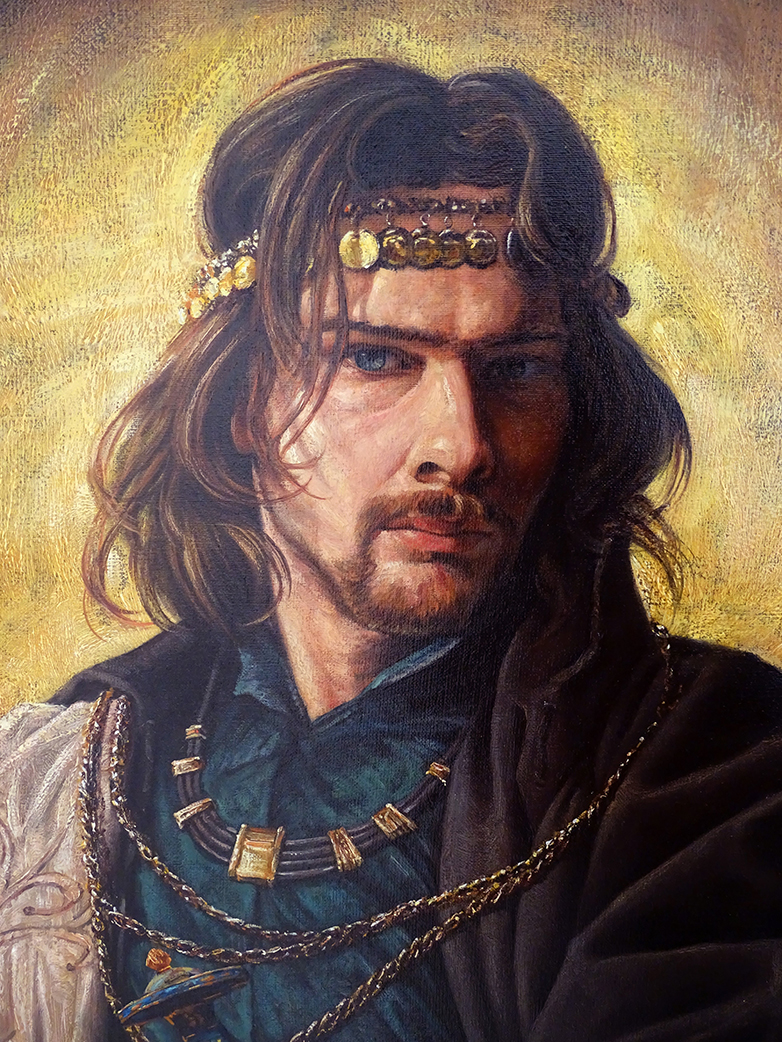
Self-portrait, 2005

Alexandre Barbera-Ivanoff (born 1973) is a French artist.

== Biography ==
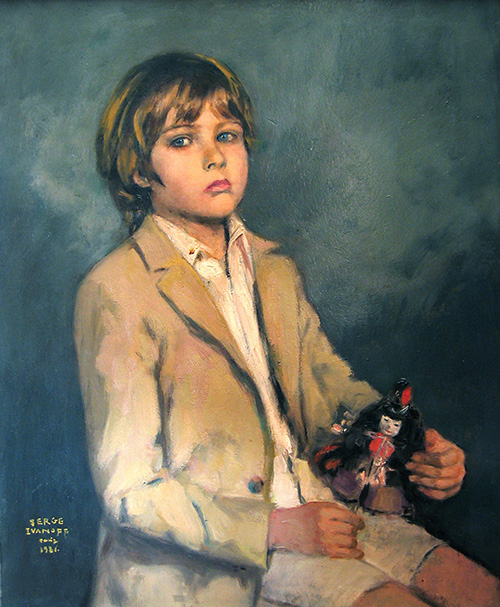
Portrait of Alexandre, aged 8, by his grandfather Serge Ivanoff (1981)

Alexandre Barbera-Ivanoff was born in 1973 in Paris, France. He studied painting from the age of 12 in a private workshop, with the painters Christian Welter, Gerard Di-Maccio, then Jean Bertholle.

The compulsory military service gave him a unique experiment: Painter in the Earth Army.

He carried out with success frescoes, in particular in the Palace of King Mohammed VI in Marrakesh (Morocco).

On September 9, 2005 in Saint-Malo, France, Alexandre Barberà-Ivanoff made public his Proclamation on Essentialisme Artistique.

He realised portraits of characters as corsairs, for example one of Jean-Marie Le Pen, in 2006.

His main work was exposed in June 2010, in the European Parliament of Strasbourg and in 2017, Villa Aurélienne, Fréjus.

Spring 2015, Barbera-Ivanoff participated, in Italy and with 4 other European painters, in the elaboration of the 25 paintings which are permanently exhibited in the center city of Cosenza. These 25 large panels (2 x 3 meters) represent the different periods of the history of the city.

Alexandre Barbera-Ivanoff is the grandson and expert of the Russian painter Serge Ivanoff.

== Illustrated books ==
- Angenard Capitaine de corsaire, ISBN 978-2-84265-491-7
- Athanase Postel Corsaire et aventurier, ISBN 978-2-84265-525-9
- Flibustiers aux Antilles, ISBN 978-2-84265-498-6
- La vida de los piratas, ISBN 978-84-9892-059-8
- Mes décadanses, Jean-Paul Chayrigues de Olmetta, ISBN 978-2-916727-21-9
- Pirati. Avventure, scontri e razzie nel Mediterraneo del XVII secolo ISBN 978-8861595095
