= Osip Braz =

Russian painter (1873–1936)

- Осип Браз
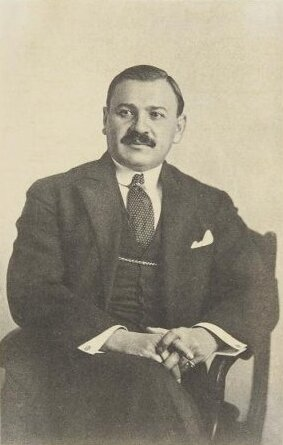
- Braz in 1914; phototype
- Born: 10 January 1873; Odessa, Kherson Governorate, Russian Empire
- Died: 6 November 1936 (aged 63) near Paris, France
- Resting place: Bagneux Cemetery, Paris
- Known for: Portrait painting
- Notable work: Anton Chekhov, 1897–1898
- Elected: Member Academy of Arts (1914)

External images
- Georgy Vereisky, Osip Braz, 1922, lithograph; Hermitage Museum, St. Petersburg
- Serge Ivanoff, Osip Braz, 1933, oil on canvas; private collection

Osip Emmanuilovich Braz (Russian: Осип Эммануилович Браз; 22 January [O.S. 10 January] 1873 – 6 November 1936) was a Russian-Jewish painter during the Modernist period, best known for his portraits.

== Biography ==
He began his art education in Odessa, now Ukraine, and continued it in Munich (1891–1893), where he studied at the Academy of Fine Arts, Munich. During his stay in Europe he studied Western European painting, which had a significant influence on his work. After Germany, he went to Paris, and then to the Netherlands where he studied the Dutch masters. The thorough knowledge of painting he gained played an important role in his future as an artist. In 1895-1896, he attended the Saint Petersburg Academy of Fine Arts, studying in the workshop of Ilya Repin.

In the following years, a series of portraits of fellow artists, including Leonid Pasternak and Sergey Ivanov, and prominent figures of Russian culture done for Pavel Tretyakov brought Braz fame. His best known work was his 1898 portrait of the writer Anton Chekhov. His talent was also displayed in his landscapes of France, the Crimea, and Finland, originating in his travels to the places mentioned. From 1900 to 1905 he gave lessons in his studio on the Moyka River. In 1907 Braz went to France, where he lived until 1911. The latest achievements of French art influenced his work. In 1914, Braz was elected an Imperial Academician, and a member of the commission for the restoration of paintings by the Hermitage Museum. In the first years of Soviet rule, he was appointed curator of the Hermitage.

In 1924 Braz was arrested on false charges of buying paintings for export abroad, and espionage, and was then imprisoned for three years in Solovki prison camp, while his art collections, including important Dutch works from the 17th century, were confiscated and made state property. In late 1926, he was released at the request of the Leningrad artistic societies. In order to avoid more trouble he moved to Germany in 1928, and then settled in Paris. He spent the last years of his life in Paris, where he continued painting, trading antiques and collecting.

== Selected paintings ==
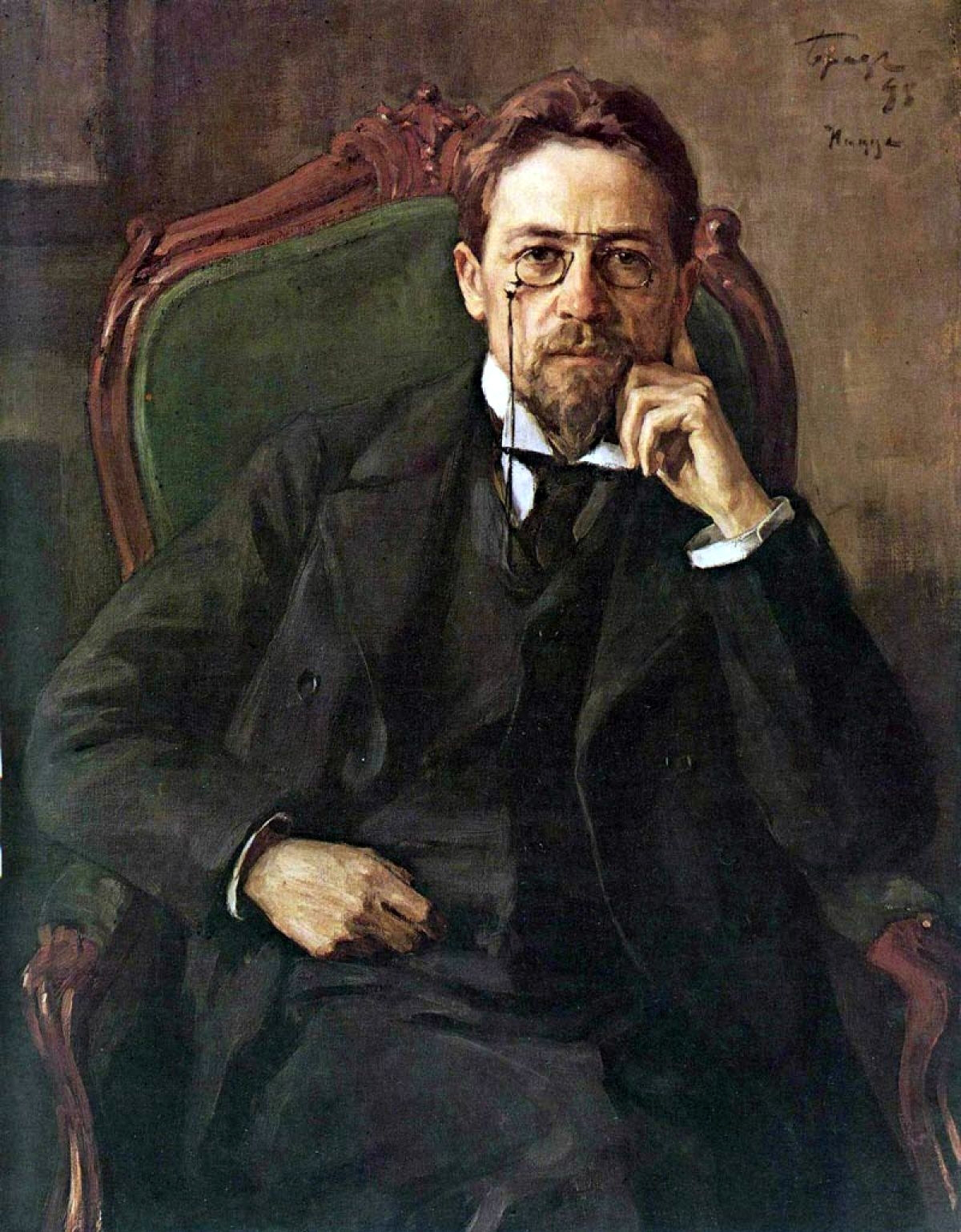
Anton Chekhov (1898)

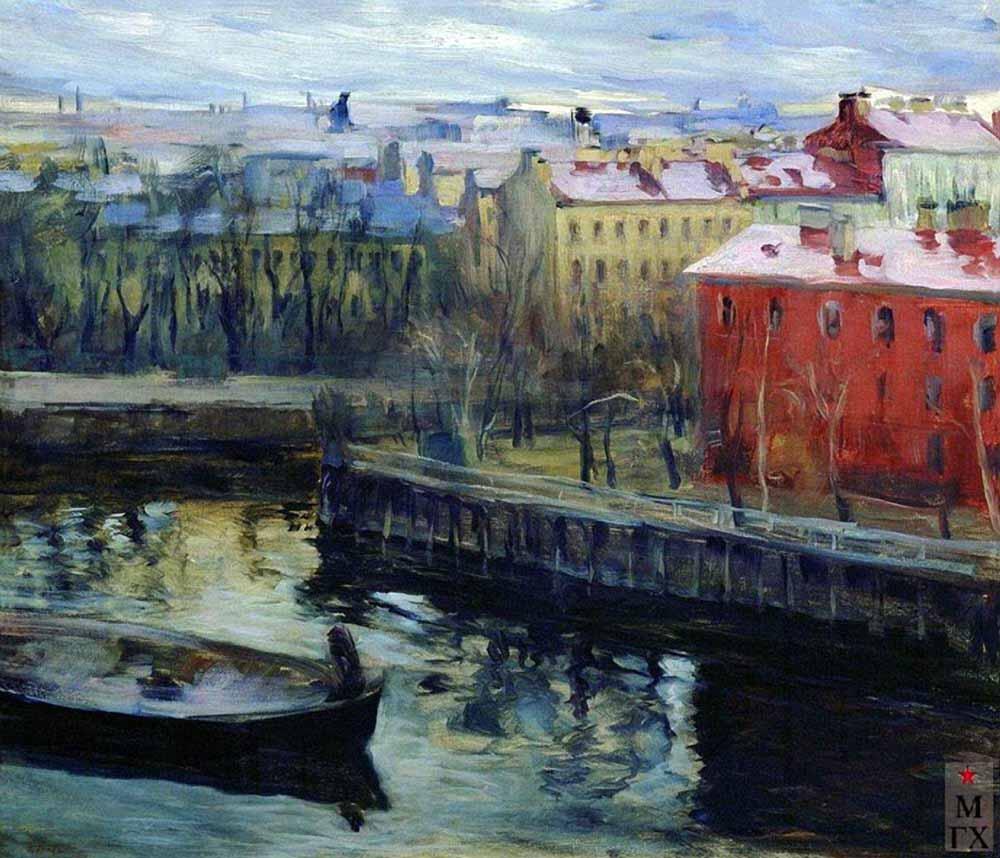
Saint Petersburg (c. 1915)

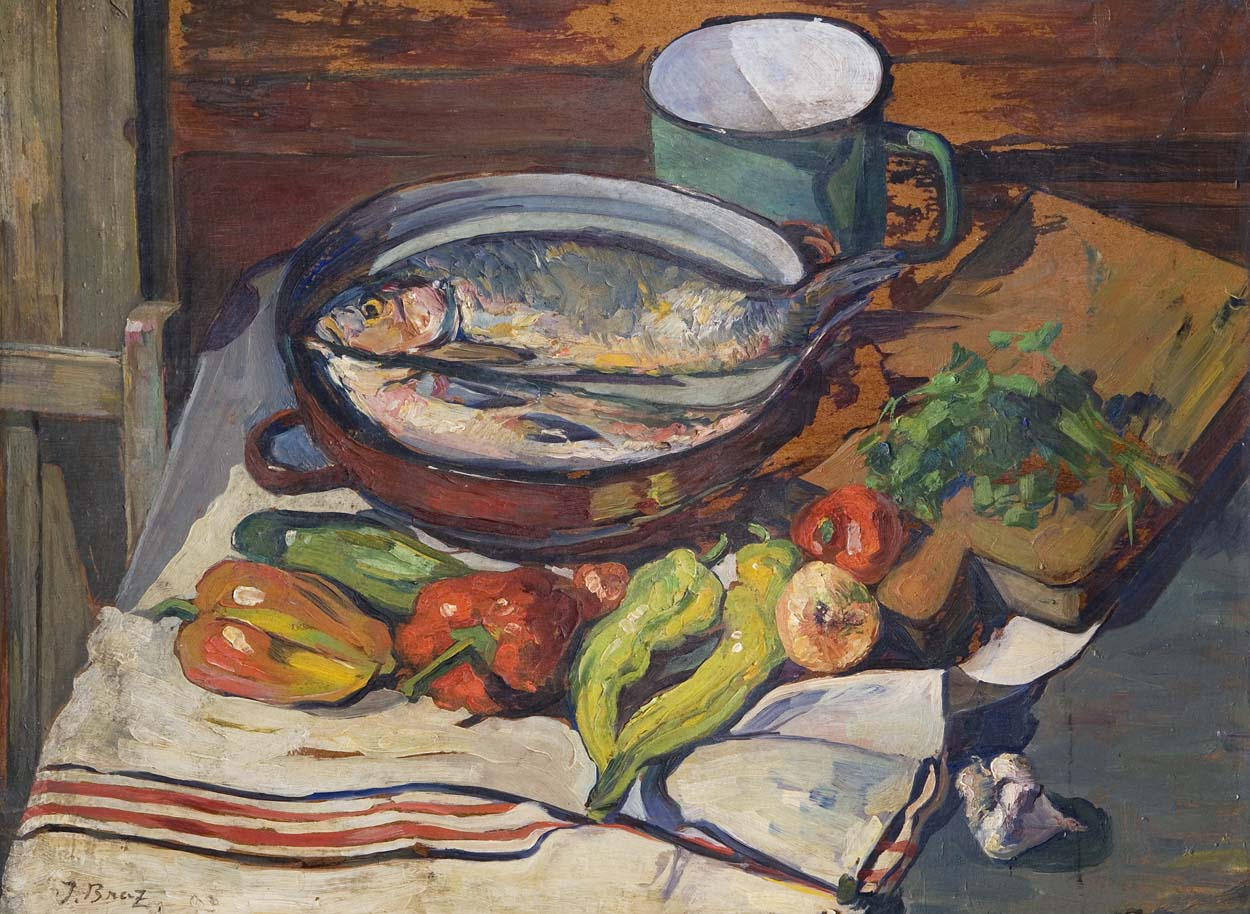
Still-life with Vegetables and Fish

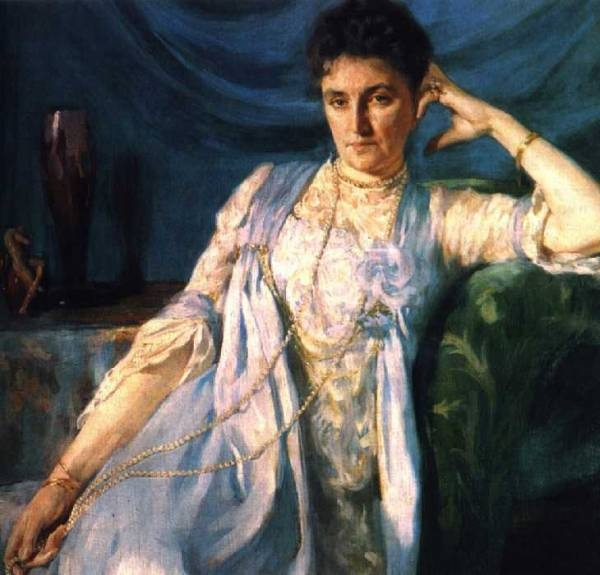
Countess Elena Tolstaya (1900)
