= Alexander Spirin =

Russian biochemist (2001)

- Александр Спирин
- Born: 4 September 1931; Korolyov, Moscow Oblast
- Died: 30 December 2020 (aged 89)
- Education: Doctor of Science (1962), Professor, Academician of the Russian Academy of Sciences
- Alma mater: Moscow State University (1954)
- Scientific career
- Fields: Biochemistry, Molecular Biology
- Workplaces: Moscow State University
- Doctoral advisor: Andrey Belozersky

Alexander Sergeevich Spirin (Russian: Александр Сергеевич Спирин; 4 September 1931 – 30 December 2020) was a Russian biochemist, Distinguished Professor at the Lomonosov Moscow State University (since 1999), a Director of Institute of Protein Research Russian Academy of Sciences, Puschino (Пущино-на-Оке), Moscow Region (Московская Область), Academician of Russian Academy of Sciences. His primary scientific interests in biochemistry included nucleic acids and protein biosynthesis.

== Career ==
In 1957 together with Andrey Nikolayevich Belozersky (Андрей Николаевич Белозерский) he conducted comparative analysis of bacterial DNA and RNA, and predicted existence of messenger RNA. He gave the first qualitative description of the structure of high-polymer RNA (1959–61). In 1963 he discovered structural transitions of ribosomes and formulated one of the principles of structure of ribosomes. He discovered artificial ribosomal self-assembly (1963–66) and proposed a molecular mechanism of the ribosome role in protein synthesis (1968). He conducted extra-cellular protein synthesis on modified ribosomes — non-enzymatic translation (together with L.P. Gavrilova) (1970–74).

In 1957, he defended his Candidate's Dissertation. In 1962, he defended his doctoral dissertation. In 1964, he received the title of Professor. He was elected a corresponding member of the Academy of Sciences of the USSR in 1966 and full member in 1970.

== Awards ==
Dr. Spirin was awarded the Sir Hans Krebs Medal in 1969, elected an Honorary Fellow of University of Granada in 1972 and awarded the prestigious Demidov Prize in 2013. In 1974 he was elected a Member of the German Academy of Sciences Leopoldina. He was elected an International member of the American Philosophical Society in 1997 and a foreign associate of the US National Academy of Sciences in April 2019.
