= Sergei Mirkin =

Russian-American molecular biologist (born 1956)

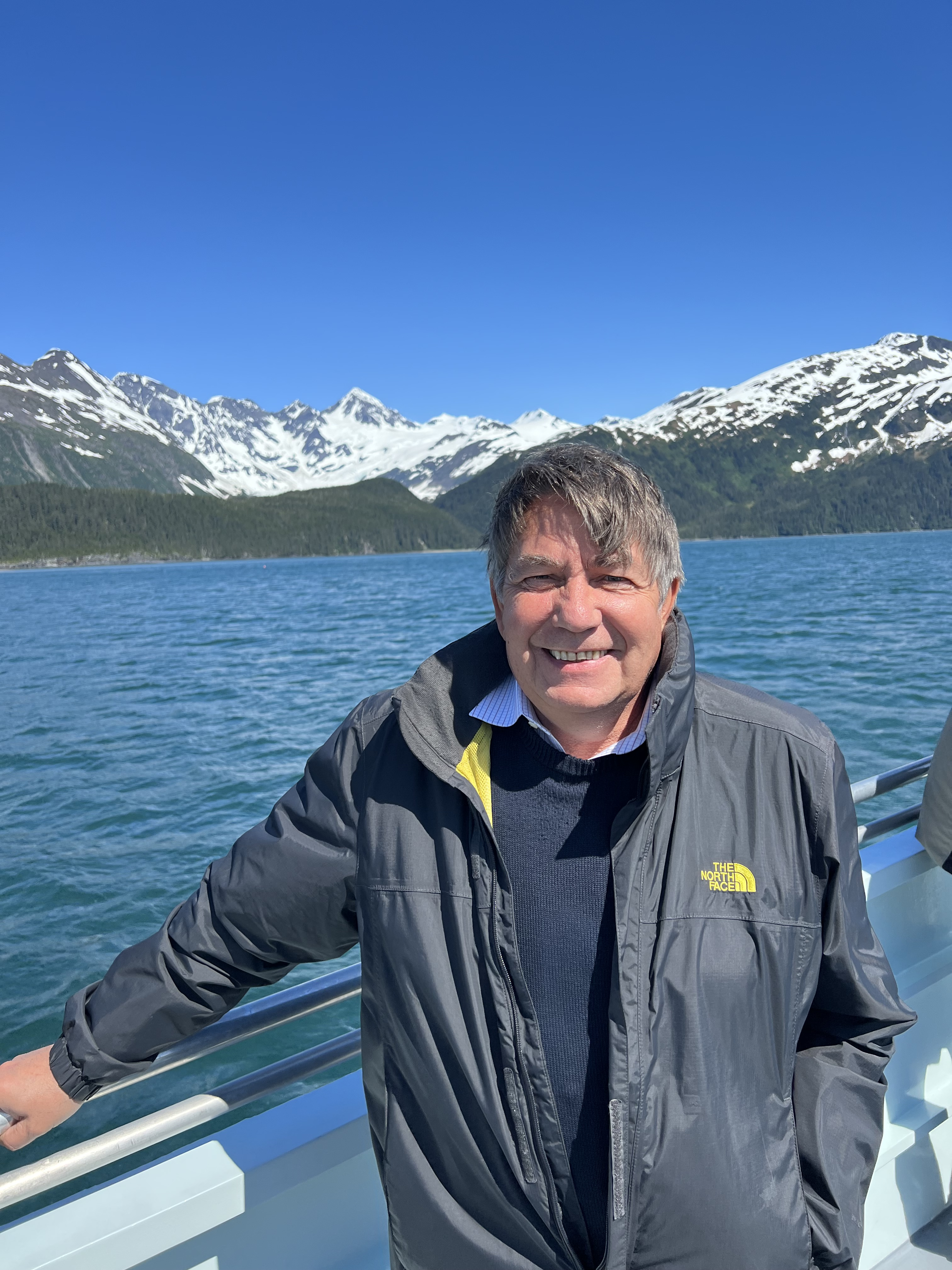
- Born: September 29, 1956 (age 69); Moscow, Russia
- Education: Moscow State University, Russian Academy of Sciences
- Known for: Genome instability
- Scientific career
- Fields: Biology, genomics
- Workplaces: Tufts University

Sergei Mirkin (born September 29, 1956) is a Russian-American biologist who studies genome instability mediated by repetitive DNA during DNA replication and transcription. He is a professor of Genetics and Molecular Biology and holds the White Family Chair in Biology at Tufts University.

== Early life and education ==
Mirkin was born in Moscow, Russia. He graduated from Moscow State University in 1978, where he majored in Genetics. Mirkin went on to pursue a Candidate of Sciences degree in Molecular Biology at the Russian Academy of Sciences’ Institute of Molecular Genetics. His thesis was under the supervision of Roman B. Khesin, a molecular biologist and Mirkin later described his formative years in the Khesin lab in his essay, “Thinking of R.B. Khesin”. By studying conditionally lethal mutants of DNA gyrase, he established a fundamental interplay between DNA supercoiling and transcription in E. coli.

== Career and research ==
Mirkin conducted his postdoctoral studies at the Institute of Molecular Genetics with Maxim Frank-Kamenetskii, a biophysicist. This work culminated with the discovery of the three-stranded H-DNA structure. Mirkin moved to the US as a Fogarty International Fellow in 1989 and joined the faculty of the Department of Genetics at University of Illinois Chicago (UIC) in 1990. He worked at UIC until 2006 rising to the rank of Professor of Biochemistry and Molecular Genetics. In 2007, he joined Tufts University as a professor and the White Family Chair in Biology.

Mirkin’s major contributions to science include discovering of the first multi-stranded DNA structure (H-DNA); detection of dynamic non-B DNA structures, including DNA cruciforms and triplexes in vivo; discovery that replication through trinucleotide repeats is compromised due to their unusual structures resulting in trinucleotide repeat disorder and unraveling the mechanisms and consequences of transcription-replication collisions in vivo.

The "Mirkin Lab". continues studying genome structure and function from two perspectives: the mechanisms responsible for the instability of DNA repeats implicated in human disease, the role of transcription-replication collisions in genome instability and the mechanisms of genome instability mediated at interstitial telomeric sequences.

== Selected publications ==
- Mirkin, S. M.; Lyamichev, V. I.; Drushlyak, K. N.; Dobrynin, V. N.; Filippov, S. A.; Frank-Kamenetskii, M. D. (December 1987). "DNA H form requires a homopurine–homopyrimidine mirror repeat". Nature. 330 (6147): 495–497. Bibcode:1987Natur.330..495M. doi:10.1038/330495a0. PMID 2825028. S2CID 4360764.
- Samadashwily, G.M.; Dayn, A.; Mirkin, S.M. (December 1993). "Suicidal nucleotide sequences for DNA polymerization". The EMBO Journal. 12 (13): 4975–4983. doi:10.1002/j.1460-2075.1993.tb06191.x. PMC 413758. PMID 8262040.
- Cox, Randal; Mirkin, Sergei M. (13 May 1997). "Characteristic enrichment of DNA repeats in different genomes". Proceedings of the National Academy of Sciences. 94 (10): 5237–5242. Bibcode:1997PNAS...94.5237C. doi:10.1073/pnas.94.10.5237. PMC 24662. PMID 7574496.
- Samadashwily, George M.; Raca, Gordana; Mirkin, Sergei M. (November 1997). "Trinucleotide repeats affect DNA replication in vivo". Nature Genetics. 17 (3): 298–304. doi:10.1038/ng1197-298. PMID 9354793. S2CID 6341978.
- Krasilnikova, M. M. (1 September 1998). "Transcription through a simple DNA repeat blocks replication elongation". The EMBO Journal. 17 (17): 5095–5102. doi:10.1093/emboj/17.17.5095. PMC 1170837. PMID 9724645.
- Krasilnikova, Maria M.; Mirkin, Sergei M. (1 March 2004). "Replication Stalling at Friedreich's Ataxia (GAA) n Repeats In Vivo". Molecular and Cellular Biology. 24 (6): 2286–2295. doi:10.1128/MCB.24.6.2286-2295.2004. PMC 355872. PMID 14993268.
- Mirkin, Ekaterina V.; Mirkin, Sergei M. (1 February 2005). "Mechanisms of Transcription-Replication Collisions in Bacteria". Molecular and Cellular Biology. 25 (3): 888–895. doi:10.1128/MCB.25.3.888-895.2005. PMC 544003. PMID 15657418.
- Mirkin, Ekaterina V.; Mirkin, Sergei M. (March 2007). "Replication Fork Stalling at Natural Impediments". Microbiology and Molecular Biology Reviews. 71 (1): 13–35. doi:10.1128/MMBR.00030-06. PMC 1847372. PMID 17347517.
- Mirkin, Sergei M. (June 2007). "Expandable DNA repeats and human disease". Nature. 447 (7147): 932–940. Bibcode:2007Natur.447..932M. doi:10.1038/nature05977. PMID 17581576. S2CID 4397592.
- Voineagu, Irina; Narayanan, Vidhya; Lobachev, Kirill S.; Mirkin, Sergei M. (22 July 2008). "Replication stalling at unstable inverted repeats: Interplay between DNA hairpins and fork stabilizing proteins". Proceedings of the National Academy of Sciences. 105 (29): 9936–9941. Bibcode:2008PNAS..105.9936V. doi:10.1073/pnas.0804510105. PMC 2481305. PMID 18632578.
- Voineagu, Irina; Surka, Christine F.; Shishkin, Alexander A.; Krasilnikova, Maria M.; Mirkin, Sergei M. (February 2009). "Replisome stalling and stabilization at CGG repeats, which are responsible for chromosomal fragility". Nature Structural & Molecular Biology. 16 (2): 226–228. doi:10.1038/nsmb.1527. PMC 2837601. PMID 19136957.
- Shishkin, Alexander A.; Voineagu, Irina; Matera, Robert; Cherng, Nicole; Chernet, Brook T.; Krasilnikova, Maria M.; Narayanan, Vidhya; Lobachev, Kirill S.; Mirkin, Sergei M. (July 2009). "Large-Scale Expansions of Friedreich's Ataxia GAA Repeats in Yeast". Molecular Cell. 35 (1): 82–92. doi:10.1016/j.molcel.2009.06.017. PMC 2722067. PMID 19595718.
- Shah, Kartik A.; Shishkin, Alexander A.; Voineagu, Irina; Pavlov, Youri I.; Shcherbakova, Polina V.; Mirkin, Sergei M. (November 2012). "Role of DNA Polymerases in Repeat-Mediated Genome Instability". Cell Reports. 2 (5): 1088–1095. doi:10.1016/j.celrep.2012.10.006. PMC 3513503. PMID 23142667.
- Aksenova, Anna Y.; Greenwell, Patricia W.; Dominska, Margaret; Shishkin, Alexander A.; Kim, Jane C.; Petes, Thomas D.; Mirkin, Sergei M. (3 December 2013). "Genome rearrangements caused by interstitial telomeric sequences in yeast". Proceedings of the National Academy of Sciences. 110 (49): 19866–19871. Bibcode:2013PNAS..11019866A. doi:10.1073/pnas.1319313110. PMC 3856781. PMID 24191060.
- Kim, Jane C; Harris, Samantha T; Dinter, Teresa; Shah, Kartik A; Mirkin, Sergei M (January 2017). "The role of break-induced replication in large-scale expansions of (CAG)n/(CTG)n repeats". Nature Structural & Molecular Biology. 24 (1): 55–60. doi:10.1038/nsmb.3334. PMC 5215974. PMID 27918542.
- Neil, Alexander J; Liang, Miranda U; Khristich, Alexandra N; Shah, Kartik A; Mirkin, Sergei M (20 April 2018). "RNA–DNA hybrids promote the expansion of Friedreich's ataxia (GAA)n repeats via break-induced replication". Nucleic Acids Research. 46 (7): 3487–3497. doi:10.1093/nar/gky099. PMC 5909440. PMID 29447396.
- Kononenko, Artem V.; Ebersole, Thomas; Vasquez, Karen M.; Mirkin, Sergei M. (August 2018). "Mechanisms of genetic instability caused by (CGG)n repeats in an experimental mammalian system". Nature Structural & Molecular Biology. 25 (8): 669–676. doi:10.1038/s41594-018-0094-9. PMC 6082162. PMID 30061600.
- Khristich, Alexandra N.; Armenia, Jillian F.; Matera, Robert M.; Kolchinski, Anna A.; Mirkin, Sergei M. (21 January 2020). "Large-scale contractions of Friedreich's ataxia GAA repeats in yeast occur during DNA replication due to their triplex-forming ability". Proceedings of the National Academy of Sciences. 117 (3): 1628–1637. Bibcode:2020PNAS..117.1628K. doi:10.1073/pnas.1913416117. PMC 6983365. PMID 31911468.
- Khristich, Alexandra N.; Mirkin, Sergei M. (March 2020). "On the wrong DNA track: Molecular mechanisms of repeat-mediated genome instability". Journal of Biological Chemistry. 295 (13): 4134–4170. doi:10.1074/jbc.REV119.007678. PMC 7105313. PMID 32060097.
- Neil, Alexander J.; Hisey, Julia A.; Quasem, Ishtiaque; McGinty, Ryan J.; Hitczenko, Marcin; Khristich, Alexandra N.; Mirkin, Sergei M. (2 February 2021). "Replication-independent instability of Friedreich's ataxia GAA repeats during chronological aging". Proceedings of the National Academy of Sciences. 118 (5). Bibcode:2021PNAS..11813080N. doi:10.1073/pnas.2013080118. PMC 7865128. PMID 33495349.
- Matos-Rodrigues, Gabriel; van Wietmarschen, Niek; Wu, Wei; Tripathi, Veenu; Koussa, Natasha C.; Pavani, Raphael; Nathan, William J.; Callen, Elsa; Belinky, Frida; Mohammed, Ashraf; Napierala, Marek; Usdin, Karen; Ansari, Aseem Z.; Mirkin, Sergei M.; Nussenzweig, André (October 2022). "S1-END-seq reveals DNA secondary structures in human cells". Molecular Cell. 82 (19): 3538–3552.e5. doi:10.1016/j.molcel.2022.08.007. PMC 9547894. PMID 36075220.
- Rastokina, A; Cebrián, J; Mozafari, N; Mandel, NH; Smith, CIE; Lopes, M; Zain, R; Mirkin, SM (8 September 2023). "Large-scale expansions of Friedreich's ataxia GAA•TTC repeats in an experimental human system: role of DNA replication and prevention by LNA-DNA oligonucleotides and PNA oligomers". Nucleic Acids Research. 51 (16): 8532–8549. doi:10.1093/nar/gkad441. PMC 10484681. PMID 37216608.
- Matos-Rodrigues, G; Hisey, JA; Nussenzweig, A; Mirkin, SM (19 October 2023). "Detection of alternative DNA structures and its implications for human disease". Molecular Cell. 83 (20): 3622–3641. doi:10.1016/j.molcel.2023.08.018. PMID 37863029.
- Hisey, JA; Radchenko, EA; Mandel, NH; McGinty, RJ; Matos-Rodrigues, G; Rastokina, A; Masnovo, C; Ceschi, S; Hernandez, A; Nussenzweig, A; Mirkin, SM (21 February 2024). "Pathogenic CANVAS (AAGGG)n repeats stall DNA replication due to the formation of alternative DNA structures". Nucleic Acids Research. doi:10.1093/nar/gkae124. PMC 11077069. PMID 38381906.

== Awards and honors ==
- Editor-in-Chief, Current Opinions in Genetics and Development, 2010-2013
- Distinguished Senior Scholar Award, Tufts University, 2020
