= Aleksandr Shmuk =

Russian biochemist

Aleksandr Aleksandrovich Shmuk (Russian: Александр Александрович Шмук) (9 November [O.S. 28 October] 1886 in Moscow – 22 January 1945, Moscow) was a Soviet biochemist and recipient of the Stalin Prize in 1942.

In 1913 Shmuk finished his studies at the Moscow Agricultural Academy. Between 1923 and 1937 he worked at the All-Union Institute of Tobacco and Low-Grade Tobacco while simultaneously holding a professorship at the Kuban Institute of Agriculture. He studied the biochemistry of tobacco and won (in 1942) the Stalin Prize for his work deriving nicotine, citric acid, and malic acid from low-grade tobacco (makhorka). He is known primarily for his three volume work The Chemistry and Technology of Tobacco and for his development of a tobacco quality index which is calculated as the ratio between soluble carbohydrates and proteins. In 1935 he became a member of the All-Union Academy of Agricultural Sciences of the Soviet Union. He finished his career at the Soviet Academy of Science's Institute of Biochemistry.

== Selected publications ==
Shmuk, A., “State Institute Tobacco Investigations”, Krasnodar (U.S.S.R.) Bull., 69, 15 (1930)
Shmuk, A., Vscsoyus. Inst. Tabach. i. Makhoroch Prom. No. 139, 3 (1937)
Shmuk, A., Bull. Acad. Sci. USSR, 6 (1937)
Shmuk, A., Papers, Acad. Sci. USSR, 2 (1940)
Shmuk A., Smirnov A., Ilyin G. "Formation of nicotine in plants grafted on tobacco" CR (Doklady) Acad. Sci. URSS. (1941)
Shmuk, A., Papers, V. I. Lenin, All-Union Academy of Agricultural Science, 1, 2 and 3 (1945)
Shmuk, A., The Chemistry and Technology of Tobacco, Vols 1,2,3 Pishchepromizdat, Moscow, 1953)

Note: Shmuk appears in the English-language literature various as Schmuck, Shmuck, and Shmuk.
