= Boris Schwanwitsch =

- Born: 26 November 1889; Poltava, Poltava Governorate, Russian Empire
- Died: 5 December 1957 (aged 68); Leningrad, Russian SFSR, Soviet Union
- Education: Saint Petersburg Imperial University

Boris Nikolayevich Schwanwitsch, sometimes Schwanwitz or Shvanvich (Russian: Борис Николаевич Шванвич; 26 November 1889 – 5 December 1957) was a Russian entomologist who specialised in Lepidoptera. He is best known for his studies of the colour pattern of the wings.

Boris Schwanwitz graduated from the St. Petersburg University (1908–1913). After graduation, he changed a number of academic positions: assistant lecturer in entomology at the Stebut Agricultural School (1915), assistant lecturer (1919) and private-docent (1926) at Petrograd (Leningrad) University, professor at the Perm University (1928–1930). In 1930, he returned to Leningrad (St. Petersburg) to take the position of the head of Entomology department of the Leningrad University (1930–1931 and 1944–1955, 1930 to 1944 the dept. for Entomology was part of the Invertebrate Zoology dept.) Vice-president of the Entomological Society of USSR (1954–1957) and the chair of the Zoology section of the Leningrad Naturalists Society.

In a series of papers he reconstructed the groundplan of the colour-pattern of the wings, first for the Rhopalocera, then for Heteroceran families. He formulated the stereomorphism principle, according to which the cryptic effect of the colour pattern is a result of its 'flattening' (the three-dimensional objects look flat) or 'disjunctive' effect (the two-dimensional objects look like a complex three-dimensional relief). To prove his point he built the plaster three-dimensional models of the lepidopteran wings, the photographs of which looked like an actual colour pattern of stripes and shades (photos were published in a series of papers and in his textbook in entomology). Among his other important contributions are a textbook in entomology with a large morphology section heavily based on Snodgrass and Weber (1949, still in use in Russian Universities), and a book on practical apiculture (1945).

His gravestone is ornamented with a reproduction of the groundplan of the colour-pattern of lepidopteran wings from his textbook.

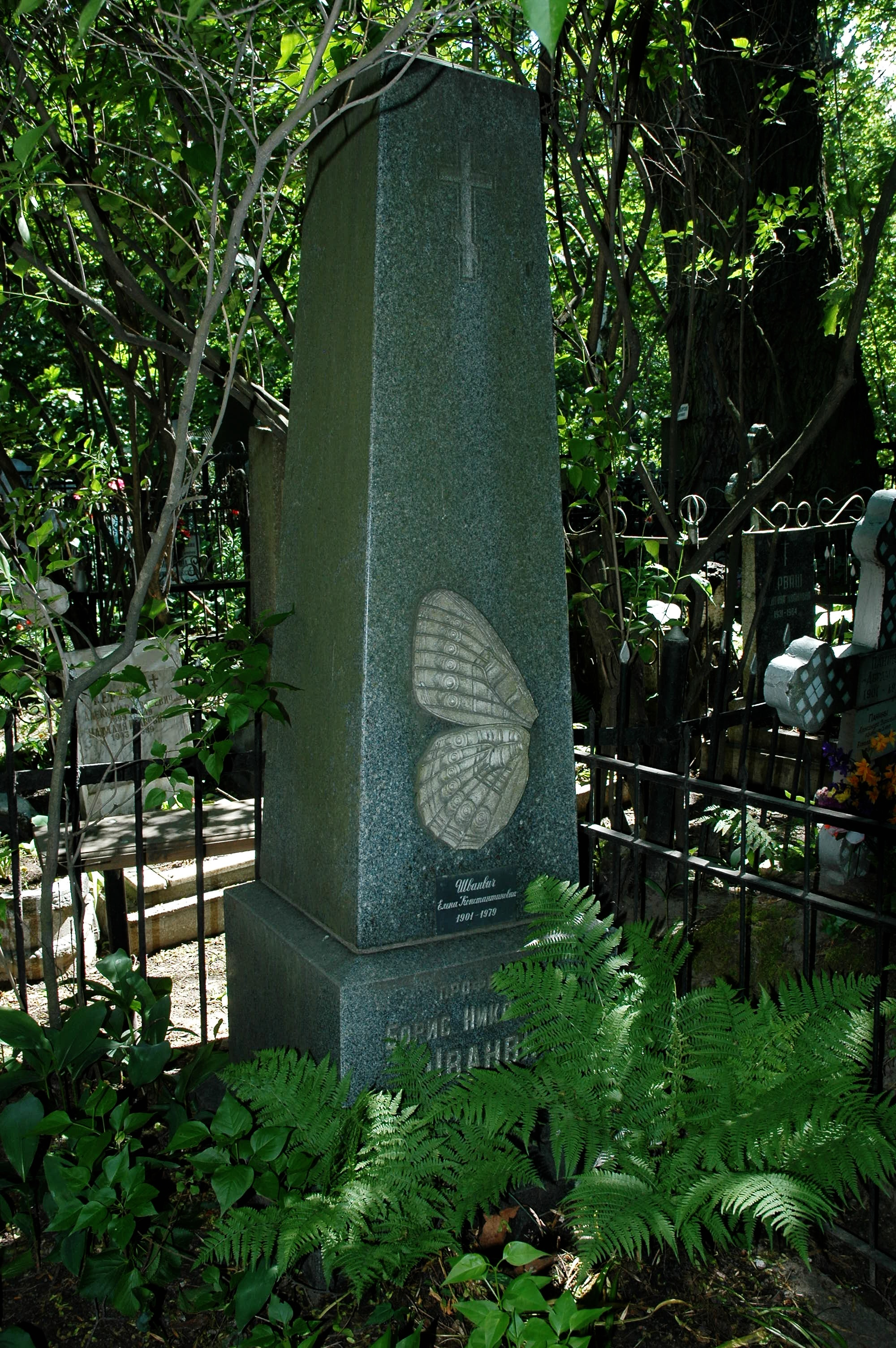
The grave of the Russian entomologist Boris Schwanwitsch at Bolsheokhtinskoe cemetery in St. Petersburg

== Selected publications ==
- On the groundplan of the wing-pattern in nymphalids and certain other families of rhopalocerous Lepidoptera. Proceedings of the Zoological Society of London, ser. B, 34: 509-528 (1924).
- Wing pattern in Papilionid Lepidoptera Entomologist vol. 76 (1943)
