= Tikhon Rabotnov =

Russian botanist (1904–2000)

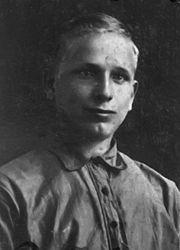
Tikhon Rabotnov (1940)

Tikhon Alexandrovich Rabotnov (Ти́хон Алекса́ндрович Рабо́тнов; 6 July 1904 – 16 September 2000) was a Russian plant ecologist. He was professor and head of the Department of Geobotany at Moscow State University until 1981. He was a father figure to generations of Russian plant ecologists. He conducted ground breaking studies in the regeneration of natural plant communities – studies which remained largely overlooked in the West.

He was born in Yaroslavl and graduated from the Agronomy Department of the University of Yaroslavl' in 1924, he obtained his PhD in 1936 and a ’habilitation’ for a professorship in 1950. He worked at the State Institute of Grassland Research for more than 40 years, while lecturing plant ecology at Moscow State University.

== Selected scientific work ==
- The life cycle of perennial herbaceous plants in meadow coenoses. Trudy Botaničeskogo Instituta im. V.L. Komarova, Akademiya nauk SSSR. Ser.3: Geobotanika 6: 7-204. 1950 (in Russian).
- Peculurities of the structure of polydominant meadow communities. Vegetatio 13: 109-116. 1966.
- On coenopoulations of perennial herbaceous plants in natural coenoses. Vegetatio 19: 87-95. 1969.
- Plant regeneration from seed in meadows of the USSR. Herbage Abstracts 39, 269-277. 1969.
- Consortia, the importance of their study for phyto-coenology. Folia Geobotanica et Phytotaxonomica 7: 1-8. 1972.
- Rabotnov, T.A. & Demin, A.P. Effect of longterm fertilization on the underground parts of meadow plants and phytocoenoses. In: Second International Symposium on Ecology and Physiology of Root Systems, pp. 243–246. 1974. Berlin.
- On phytocoenotypes. Phytocoenologia 2: 66-72. 1975.
- Structure and method of studying coenotic populations of perennial herbaceous plants. Soviet Journal of Ecology, 9, 99-105. 1978.
- On some problems of the coevolution of organisms. Phytocoenologia 7: 1-7. 1980.
- Importance of the evolutionary approach to the study of allelopathy. Soviet Journal of Ecology 12: 127-130. 1982.
- Phytocoenology, 3rd ed. Izd. Moskva Univ., Moskva. 1992 (in Russian). Translated to German as *Phytozönologie: Struktur und Dynamik natürlicher Ökosysteme. Verlag Eugen Ulmer, Stuttgart. 1995.
- Dynamics of plant coenotic populations. In: White. J. (ed.) The population structure of vegetation, pp. 121–142. Junk, Dordrecht. 1985.
- On ecological niche of plants. Russian Journal of Ecology 26: 221-222. 1995.

Rabotnov founded and edited the still ongoing Biological Flora of the Moscow Region from volume 1 (1974) to his death (vol 8, 1990).

- For contents in Russian - see
- For contents in English (by 1996) - see Poschlod, P. et al. (1996) The biological flora of Central Europe: an ecological bibliography. Bulletin of the Geobotanical Institute ETH 62: 89-108.

== See also ==
- Tukulan
