= Andrey Belozersky =

Soviet biologist and biochemist

Andrey Nikolayevich Belozersky
- Born: 16 (29) August 1905; Tashkent, Turkestan region, Russian Empire
- Died: 31 December 1972; Moscow, Soviet Union
- Citizenship: Soviet Union
- Education: National University of Uzbekistan (NUUz)
- Known for: pioneer of molecular biology in Soviet Union
- Awards: Hero of Socialist Labor (1969), three Orders of Lenin (1961, 1965, 1969), Order of the Red Banner of Labor (1951)
- Scientific career
- Fields: Biochemistry
- Workplaces: Department of Plant Biochemistry of the MSU Biology Faculty
- Academic advisors: Andrey Vasilyevich Blagoveshchensky, Alexander Robertovich Kiesel
- Notable students: A. S. Spirin, A. S. Antonov, B. F. Vanyushin, I. B. Naumova

Andrey Nikolayevich Belozersky (Андре́й Никола́евич Белозе́рский) (29 August 1905 (Tashkent, Turkestan region, Russian Empire) – 31 December 1972 (Moscow, Soviet Union)) was a Soviet biologist and biochemist, one of the pioneers of molecular biology studies in the Soviet Union. He was an academic of the Academy of Sciences of the Soviet Union from 1962 and its vice president from 28 May 1971 to 31 December 1972. He conducted research related to the composition of nucleic acids and their distribution in different organisms. He also obtained the first evidence of the existence of mRNA and laid the foundations of genosystematics.

== Biography ==
=== Childhood ===
A. N. Belozersky was born in Tashkent, in the family of an official. His father, Nikolay Andreevich Belozersky, was born into a Russian family that migrated to Central Asia, and worked as a lawyer in the judicial chamber. His mother, Evgeniya Semenovna Lahtina, worked as a musician teacher in a gymnasium. There were three children in their family: Nikolay, Lidiya, and Andrey. When his parents died in 1913, Andrey was sent to the Gatchina orphanage, but he was accepted into the family of his mother's sister in 1917, when the orphanage was closed. Tatyana Semenovna Ivanova, sister of Andrey's mother, lived in Verny town (now Alma-Ata).

=== Student years ===
In 1921, when Belozersky was 16, he was enrolled at the National University of Uzbekistan (NUUz) in the Faculty of Physics and Mathematics. At that time, Belozersky didn't even have a secondary diploma. He was taught by N. A. Dimo, A. L. Brodsky, P. A. Baranov, I. A. Raikova, A. I. Vvedensky, and others. While studying, Belozersky worked first as a laboratory assistant (1923–1924), and from 1925 taught at the Faculty of Labor in NUUz. Also, at this university, under the guidance of A. V. Blagoveshchensky, he did his first research work — an investigation of proton concentration in water extracts of some mountain plants’ leaves.

In 1927, Belozersky graduated from the Faculty of Physics and Mathematics with the specialty of "plant physiology". From 1927 to 1930 he studied at the postgraduate school of NUUz.

=== Work at Moscow University ===
In 1930, Belozersky met Alexander Robert Kiesel during a trip to Moscow and was invited to work at the Department of Plant Biochemistry at Moscow University, which was being created at that time. Under the guidance of A. R. Kiesel, Belozersky began to study plant proteins at different stages of plant ontogenesis, in particular nucleoproteins, which are complexes of proteins with nucleic acids.

Beginning in 1930, A. N. Belozersky worked at the Department of Plant Biochemistry of Moscow State University. He started as an assistant (1930–1932), then became an associate professor (1932–1943), and finally a professor (1943–1972). In 1938, he was awarded the degree of Candidate of Sciences, and in 1943, he defended his dissertation for the degree of Doctor of Biological Sciences on the topic "Nucleoproteins and polynucleic acids of plants."

In 1943, A. N. Belozersky was appointed professor of the Biological Faculty of Moscow State University. In 1960, he was appointed Head of the Department of Plant Biochemistry of Moscow State University (now the Department of Molecular Biology of the Faculty of Biology of Moscow State University). After the death of A. N. Belozersky, the department was headed by his student, academician A. S. Spirin.

From 1951 to 1954, A. N. Belozersky was director of the Biology and Soil Research Institute and, between 1954 and 1960, he was head of the Botanical Department of the Biology and Soil Faculty.

In 1963, A. N. Belozersky became the head of the newly organized Department of Virology at the Biology and Soil Faculty, and in 1965, the newly created problematic interfaculty laboratory of Bioorganic Chemistry, which in 1991 became the A. N. Belozersky Research Institute of Physico-Chemical Biology.

A. N. Belozersky was directly involved in the renovation and modernization of laboratories and participated in the creation of new places for practical classes. He improved the existing lecture courses for students in the Faculty of Biology and created new ones. He wrote a "Practical Guide to Plant Biochemistry" together with N.I. Proskuryakov.

A. N. Belozersky was very fond of young people, closely following the educational and scientific activities of students. Belozersky created a large school of Russian biochemists (A. S. Spirin, A. S. Antonov, B. F. Vanyushin, I. B. Naumova, etc.). Under his leadership, a large number of people defended their PhDs and doctoral dissertations, and a number of students became members of the Russian Academy of Sciences (RAS).

=== Other activity ===
A. N. Belozersky founded a new laboratory of antibiotics (now the Laboratory of Biochemistry of Stress of Microorganisms) at the A. N. Bach Institute of Biochemistry of the USSR Academy of Sciences (1946), where he led until 1960.

From 1947 to 1951, A. N. Belozersky worked at the N. F. Gamalei Institute of Epidemiology and Microbiology of the USSR Academy of Medical Sciences, where he carried out work related to the study of antigenic and immunogenic properties of E. coli nucleoproteins in association with V. D. Gekker.

A. N. Belozersky has repeatedly participated in international congresses on biochemistry (Belgium, Austria) and lectured at the University of Tirana (Albania), Peking University (China), Charles University (Czech Republic), and Sofia University (Bulgaria).

A. N. Belozersky conducted extensive scientific and editorial work. He has prepared a number of monographs and reviews for publication. He was the chief editor of the journal "Successes of Modern Biology" (1963–1972) and editor of the journals "Biochemistry", "Cytology", and "Bulletin of the USSR Academy of Sciences."

A. N. Belozersky worked for a long time at the USSR Academy of Sciences. In 1963, he was elected Deputy Academician-Secretary of the Department of Biochemistry, Biophysics, and Chemistry of Physiologically Active Compounds of the USSR Academy of Sciences; in 1970, he became Academician-Secretary of the department; and in 1971, he became Vice-President of the USSR Academy of Sciences and Chairman of the Section of Chemical-Technological and Biological Sciences of the Presidium of the USSR Academy of Sciences. He worked to promote fundamental scientific achievements to meet the needs of industry and agriculture. He was one of the organizers of the development of a detailed plan for the study of molecular biology in the USSR, which was formulated in the Government Decree of 19 April 1974 (adopted after the death of A. N. Belozersky): "On measures to accelerate the development of molecular biology and molecular genetics and the use of their achievements in the national economy."

=== Personal life ===
A. N. Belozersky was married twice and had three children: his daughter Natalia from his first marriage and two children from his second marriage, Mikhail and Tatiana. The children were educated in areas close to biology.

A. N. Belozersky died in Moscow from stomach cancer on 31 December 1972, and was buried at the Novodevichy Cemetery in Moscow.

== Scientific activity and achievements ==
=== Nucleic acids investigation ===
In the early 1930s, A. N. Belozersky was the first in the USSR to begin a systematic study of nucleic acids. At that time, two types of nucleic acids were known: thymonucleic (DNA) isolated from calf thymus and "yeast" (RNA) found in yeast and wheat seedlings. The first was called "animal," and the second was called "vegetable." The first significant works performed by A. N. Belozersky relate to the issue of "animal" and "plant" nucleic acids. In 1934, articles by A. R. Kiesel and A. N. Belozersky appeared in the journal "Hoppe-Seyler's Zeitschrift für Physiologische Chemie" and then in 1935 in the "Scientific Notes of Moscow State University''. In these articles, the presence of thymonucleic acid in plant cells was shown. A. N. Belozersky was the first to isolate and identify thymine, first from the seedlings of pea seeds and then from the seeds of other legumes. He isolated the DNA itself from horse chestnut seeds. Subsequently, the presence of RNA and DNA was confirmed in linden buds, onion bulbs, and wheat germ. The results obtained by Belozersky made it possible to reject the division of nucleic acids into "animal" and "plant" and to affirm the idea of the universal distribution of DNA in both plant and animal cells.

While Belozersky was studying bacteria, he noted the high content of nucleic acids in cells, amounting to 30% of the dry weight, unlike higher organisms. A. N. Belozersky concluded that this fact is associated with high rates of reproduction and growth of bacteria. Later, A. N. Belozersky showed that the amount of nucleic acids, especially RNA, is not a constant value for one species and changes with the age of the culture: young bacterial cells may contain more RNA than old ones. Andrey Nikolaevich pointed out a new aspect (at the same time with T. Caspersson and J. Brachet): the relationship of the number of nucleic acids with the intensity of protein biosynthesis. These conclusions were made by A. N. Belozersky long before the appearance of the "molecular biology" term associated with the publication in the journal "Nature" by James J. Watson and F. Crick on the establishment of a spatial model of the DNA molecule. Thus, as a result of research from 1939 to 1947, A. N. Belozersky obtained the first scientific information in the world on the content of nucleic acids in various bacterial species.

In a paper published in 1957 in Russian, and in 1958 in English, A. N. Belozersky and his student A. S. Spirin discovered an inconsistency between the composition of DNA and ribosomal RNA. They noticed that, with a wide range of DNA changes, the composition of RNA varies little from species to species. At the same time, the composition of proteins also varies greatly from species to species. Soviet scientists have proved that the DNA-RNA-protein biosynthesis scheme requires that all elements be in a certain composite correspondence. This conclusion led to the destruction for the old scheme of this process. F. Crick wrote about the article by Belozersky and Spirin:

“The phase of confusion was started by an article by Belozersky and Spirin in 1958. The data they provided showed that our ideas on a number of important points were too simplistic.”

Soviet scientists discovered that there is a certain part of RNA in the cells that coincides in composition with DNA and is determined by its structure. Later, they suggested that this part of RNA is a link in the transmission of genetic information from DNA to proteins. Part of the RNA discovered by Belozersky and Spirin turned out to be a rapidly synthesizing form of RNA that transfers genetic information from DNA to ribosomes. Later, this part of the RNA was called messenger RNA (mRNA).The work on the study of the nucleotide composition of DNA and RNA in bacteria was the beginning of numerous studies of the composition of nucleic acids in other organisms. These studies were conducted from 1958 to 1965 in groups of the Moscow State University and the USSR Academy of Sciences, headed by A. N. Belozersky. As a result, the composition of DNA and RNA was studied in many actinomycetes (N. V. Shugaeva), fungi (B. F. Vanyushin), algae (M. V. Pakhomova, G. P. Serenkov), and some higher plants (B. F. Vanyushin). A. N. Belozersky actively participated in the creation of modern genosystematics (DNA systematics, DNA taxonomy). Today, this direction is being developed by A. S. Antonov and other students of Belozersky.The scientific activities of the groups headed by A. N. Belozersky include the study of the species functional specificity of adaptive RNAs (G. N. Zaitseva), the study of changes in the amino acid composition of proteins in response to the substitution of nucleotides in DNA (A. S. Antonov), and the study of phosphate in the simplest organisms, particularly in aspects of its transfer from the environment, transport, accumulation, and forms of existence (I. S. Kulaev, M. S. Kritsky).

=== Antibiotics ===
Another object of A. N. Belozersky's research was antibiotics, the study of which he began during World War II. A. N. Belozersky studied the chemical structure of one of the most effective Soviet antibiotics, gramicidin S, first obtained by G. F. Gause and his wife M. G. Brazhnikova. In the first works on this topic, the polypeptide nature of gramicidin was shown and its amino acid composition was determined (A. N. Belozersky, T. S. Paskhina). Furthermore, several substituted gramicidin derivatives were obtained, and their activity was studied. These works were carried out in the newly organized laboratory of antibiotics at the A. N. Bach Institute of Biochemistry.

=== Structure of proteins and their complexes with nucleic acids ===
A. N. Belozersky was interested in the question of the existence of complexes between nucleic acids and proteins (called "nucleoproteins") in in vivo systems. He made an attempt to fractionate nucleoprotein samples and thus developed a methodological scheme for this process, which later played a major role in the study of nucleic acids. Based on his experiments, Belozersky concluded that nucleic acids in cells exist in various complexes with proteins: unbound, labile, and firmly bound.

It was assumed by F. Mischer and A. Kossel that the protein component of nucleoproteins is histone, a protein that doesn't contain tryptophan. The research of A. N. Belozersky in 1936–1942 established for the first time the presence of tryptophan-containing proteins in the nucleoproteins of plants and animals. Also, A. N. Belozersky and G. I. Abelev isolated histones from wheat germ deoxyribonucleoprotein. This was another proof of the unity of the principles of the organization of the nuclear apparatus in plants and animals.

=== Other areas of research ===
The study of the DNA nucleotide composition in different organisms led to another direction – the study of methylated purine and pyrimidine bases in DNA. These studies were carried out by a student of A. N. Belozersky, B. F. Vanyushin.

A. N. Belozersky made a great contribution to the research on inorganic polyphosphates and teichoic acids. At the Department of Plant Biochemistry, V. B. Korchagin (1954) and I. S. Kulaev (1957) wrote the first PhD dissertations on polyphosphates. I.B. Naumova (1903–2003), a graduate of the Department of Plant Biochemistry, studied the structure and functions of teichoic acids.

During his years at the N. F. Gamalei Institute of Epidemiology and Microbiology of the USSR Academy of Medical Sciences, A. N. Belozersky conducted studies of the antigenic and immunogenic properties of E. coli nucleoproteins. Under his leadership, studies of polysaccharides were initiated in different groups of microorganisms: algae, azobacteria, and actinomycetes. A wide variety of chemical structures of cell wall polysaccharides were found.

== Awards and scientific recognition ==
A. N. Belozersky was elected a corresponding member in 1958, and in 1962, a full member of the USSR Academy of Sciences for his great contribution to science. He was awarded the title of Hero of Socialist Labor (1969), three Orders of Lenin (1961, 1965, 1969), and the Order of the Red Banner of Labor (1951). Belozersky was also awarded the medal "For Valiant Labor in the Great Patriotic War of 1941–1945" and the medal "For the Defense of Moscow" (1945).

In 1948, the Scientific Council of Moscow State University awarded Andrey Nikolaevich the first M. V. Lomonosov Prize for his work "On the Nucleoproteins and Polynucleotides of Certain Bacteria."

In 1971, A. N. Belozersky was elected a member of the German Academy of Natural Scientists "Leopoldina" in the German Democratic Republic.

A. N. Belozersky's name was assigned to the Research Institute of Physico-Chemical Biology of Lomonosov Moscow State University.
