= Victor Shmidt =

Russian zoologist (1865–1932)

- Victor Shmidt
- Born: April 2, 1865; Saint Petersburg, Russia
- Died: May 7, 1932; Perm, Russian SFSR, Soviet Union

Academic background
- Education: Imperial Dorpat University (1890)

Academic work
- Main interests: Zoology, anatomy, embryology

Victor or Viktor Karlovich Shmidt (Russian: Ви́ктор Ка́рлович Шми́дт, IPA: [ˈvʲiktər ˈkarləvʲɪtɕ ˈʂmʲit]) was a Russian zoologist and professor. He was the head of Perm University, the head of the Perm National Research Biology Institute at Perm State University, and a leading Russian specialist in microscopic anatomy and embryology.

== Sources ==
- "Шмидт, Виктор Карлович" . Brockhaus and Efron Encyclopedic Dictionary (in Russian). 1906.
