= Viktor Grebennikov =

20th-century Russian mystic

Viktor Stepanovich Grebennikov (Russian: Виктор Степанович Гребенников; 23 April 1927 – 2001) was a self-proclaimed Russian scientist, biologist, entomologist and paranormal researcher best known for his claim to have invented a levitation platform which operated by attaching dead insect body parts to the underside. Grebennikov wrote detailed accounts of his experiences flying over the Russian countryside using his levitation device. These flying experiences as well as his reported observations of other paranormal phenomena, usually involving insect nests or parts, appear in his self-published book My World (Moi Mir. Novosibirsk, Russia: Sovetskaya Sibir, 1997).

== Early life ==
Viktor Grebennikov was born in Simferopol. His mother was a noblewoman, his father was a mechanic.

== Activity ==
In Krasnoobsk, Grebennikov worked as a junior researcher at the Research Institute of Soil Management and Chemicalization of Agriculture.

In 1976, he founded the Museum of Agroecology and Environmental Protection.

Although once popular with readers who dreamed of human unpowered flight, Grebennikov's flight and other paranormal claims were promptly rejected by skeptics and scientists outside of the paranormal community as his reports were devoid of conclusive proof or public demonstration. He claimed that his camera shutter was jammed during the flights due to a time-warping force-field generated by the secret "geometric" power of chitin.

He was granted a Russian patent in 1995 on a device containing beehive cells (dry honeycomb) that is claimed to enhance the effectiveness of therapeutic drugs in a patient.

Grebennikov died in Novosibirsk in 2001.

The paranormal author Brian Snellgrove cites some of Grebennikov's My World claims in his books.
