= Cardal, Uruguay =

Cardal Capital de la Cuenca Lechera
- Town
- Location in Uruguay
- Coordinates: 34°17′26″S 56°23′20″W
- Country: Uruguay
- Department: Florida Department
- Established: 1900

Population (2011)
  - Total: 1,202
- Time zone: UTC − 3
- Postal code: 94007
- Dial plan: +598 4339 (+4 digits)

Cardal is a town in the Florida Department of south-central Uruguay. It is known as the "Capital de la Cuenca Lechera" (Capital of the Dairy Basin) of Uruguay and as the place where the Ceibal project began in 2007.

== Geography ==
The town is located on Route 77 between the towns of Independencia and 25 de Mayo, about 14 kilometres (8.7 mi) north of Veinticinco de Agosto and about 27 kilometres (17 mi) (straight-line distance) south of the departmental capital, Florida.

== History ==
The date when the settlement was founded is uncertain, but it is generally taken to be the establishment of its railway station in 1900. It was declared a "Pueblo" (village) on 10 September 1937 by Law No. 9.688, and its status was elevated to "Villa" (town) on 28 January 1985 by Law No. 15.707.

On 10 May 2007, Escuela No. 24 "Italia" in Cardal became the first school to receive laptops under Uruguay's Ceibal project. The town was chosen for the pilot so that every child in the locality would have a computer.

== Population ==
In 2011 Cardal had a population of 1,202.

Year	Population
1963	1,117
1975	1,155
1985	1,320
1996	1,274
2004	1,290
2011	1,202

Source: Instituto Nacional de Estadística de Uruguay

== Government ==
The town has a Junta Local (local board) of the Intendencia de Florida.

== Economy ==
Dairy farming is the main economic activity in the area. By Law No. 17.916 of 2005, Cardal was designated the "Capital de la Cuenca Lechera" of Uruguay, as the centre of the country's highest milk-producing area. The local producers' organisation Grupo Cardal, which celebrated its 50th anniversary in 2023, was founded by dairy farmer Pascual Di Santi, who also promoted the town's designation as capital of the dairy basin.

Since 2006 the town has held the annual Fiesta Nacional de la Leche (National Milk Festival), which has been declared of tourist interest by the Ministry of Tourism.

== Services and housing ==
The town has a public health clinic, the Policlínica Cardal, run by the state health provider ASSE. It also has a public secondary school, the Liceo de Cardal.

Several housing developments in Cardal have been built by MEVIR, Uruguay's public rural housing programme. In 2022 it inaugurated 46 homes in Cardal and surrounding areas, including a 25-home development named after Roberto "Tito" Lans, a local dairy farmer who had promoted the first such housing schemes in the town. A further development of 24 homes was built in 2023.

== Sport ==
The town has a social and sports club, the Club Social y Deportivo 19 de Abril, founded in 1917, which has long served as a meeting place for the local community. Its football team competes in the Liga de Fútbol de Florida, including in youth categories, and won promotion to the league's first division in 2012. Children play baby fútbol at the Club Sureños.
