= Education in Uruguay =

General details
- Primary languages: Spanish

Education in Uruguay is mandatory for a total of fourteen years, which includes two years of pre-primary education, six years of primary education, and six years of secondary education. It begins at the preschool level and is provided free of charge from pre-primary through university. In 1996, Uruguay had a gross primary enrollment rate of 111.7% and a net primary enrollment rate of 92.9%. "Data on primary school attendance rates in Uruguay were not available as of 2001.

== Characteristics ==
Uruguay had the highest literacy rate in Latin America, at 96 percent in 1985, which has increased to 98.9% in recent years according to the World Bank. There was no appreciable difference in literacy rates between males and females, but there were discrepancies between urban and rural rates (rural rates being demonstrably lower). Uruguay's system of universal, free, and secular education required a total of eleven years of compulsory school attendance, from ages six to fifteen. The proportion of children of primary school age enrolled in school had long been virtually 100 percent. Furthermore, from 1965 to 1985 the proportion of children of secondary school age enrolled in some form of secondary school grew from 44 to 70 percent, also the highest rate in Latin America. The postsecondary education enrollment rate was about 20 percent. Coeducation was the norm, and females and males attended school in near-equal numbers at all levels. As is typical of any country, however, rates of schooling were higher in urban areas than in rural areas.

The quality of education in Uruguay was rated as high. Teaching was a socially respected profession and one that paid relatively well. Most teachers, trained in teachers' training colleges, were deemed well qualified. The main problem confronting the education system was the inadequacy of facilities, instructional materials, and teachers' aides. Rural areas often suffered from woefully insufficient facilities and supplies. Urban schools often were seriously overcrowded and were forced to resort to holding classes in multiple shifts. In addition, dropout and repetition rates, although moderate by Latin American standards, were still considered high.

== Primary education ==
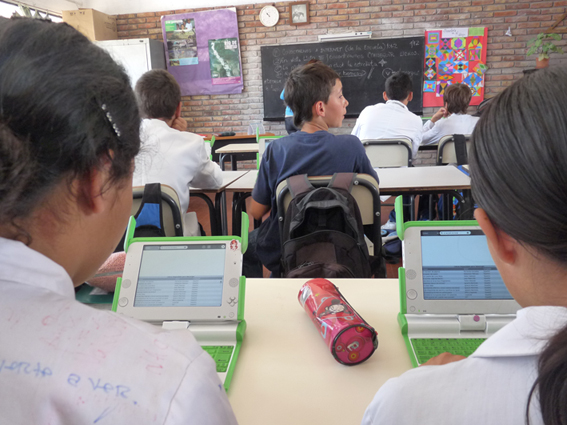
State Primary School students in Uruguay with XO computers

Primary education in Uruguay was free and compulsory; it encompassed six years of instruction. The number of primary schools in 1987 was 2,382, including 240 private schools. There were 16,568 primary school teachers and 354,179 primary school students. This resulted in a pupil-teacher ratio of approximately twenty-one to one in 1987, compared with about thirty to one in 1970. Boys and girls were enrolled in almost equal numbers.

As of July 30, 2020, two years of pre-primary education have been declared compulsory along the already mandated six years of primary education, and three years of middle school education.

== Secondary education ==
General education in secondary schools encompassed six years of instruction divided into two three-year cycles. The first, or basic, cycle was compulsory; the second cycle was geared to university preparation. In addition to the academic track, public technical education schools provided secondary school education that was technical and vocational in nature. The two systems were parallel in structure, and there was little provision for transfer between the two. All sectors of society traditionally tended to prefer the academic course of study, which was regarded as more prestigious. As a result, academic secondary education had expanded more rapidly than technical education in the second half of the twentieth century. In 1987 there were 276 general secondary schools in Uruguay, including 118 private schools. However, the public high schools were much larger, so that in 1987 they actually contained 145,083 of the country's 175,710 secondary school students enrolled in both day classes and night classes. In addition, ninety-four technical education schools had a total enrollment of 52,766 students in 1987. Male and female enrollment at the secondary level was roughly equal, but females slightly outnumbered males overall (constituting, for example, 53 percent of the secondary school student body in 1982). It appeared that females were in the majority in the basic cycle but were very slightly outnumbered by males in the university preparatory cycle.

== Higher education ==
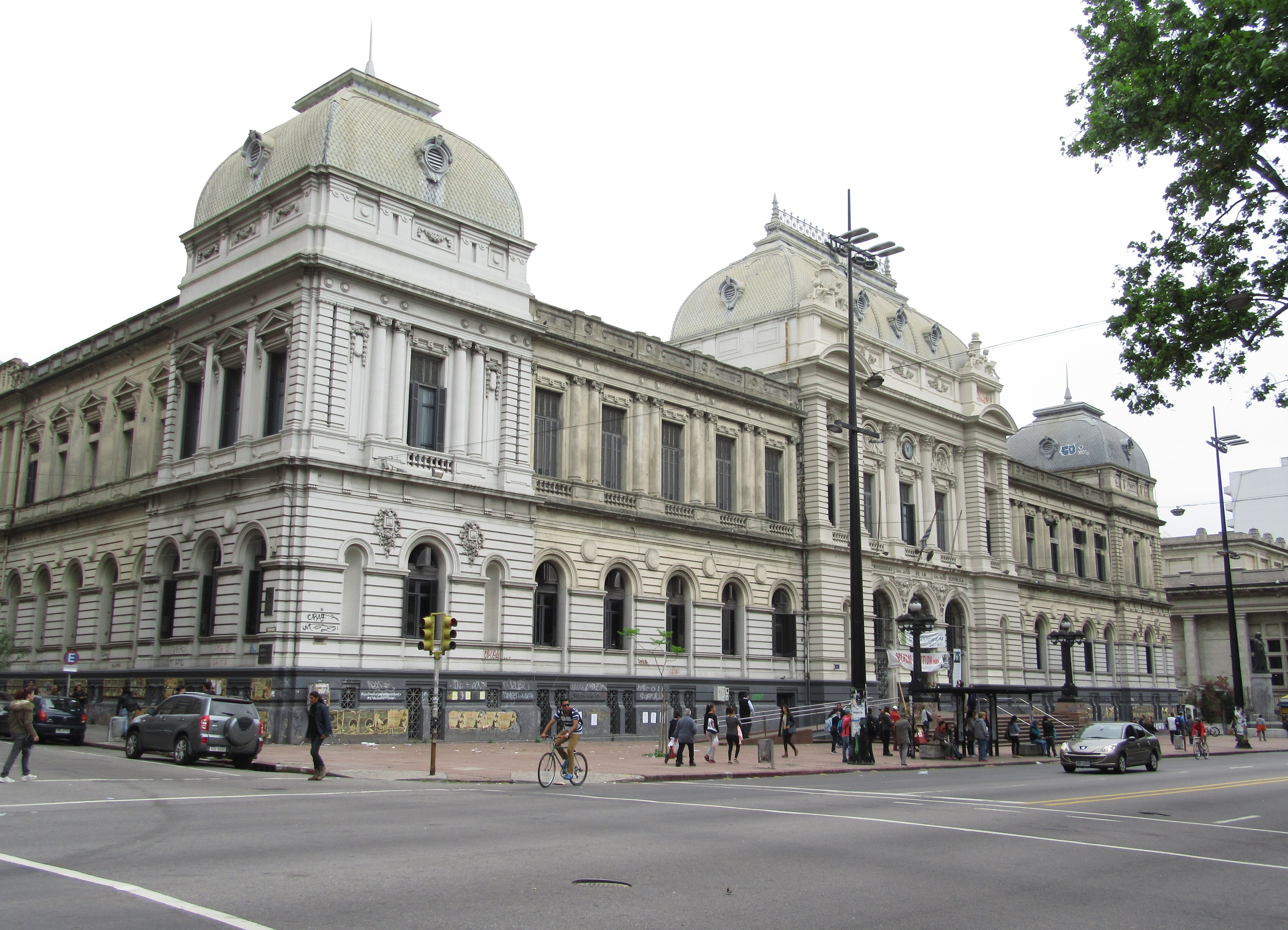
Faculty of law of the University of the Republic

Uruguay has only two public universities, the University of the Republic founded in 1849 and the Universidad Tecnológica del Uruguay founded in 2012, and four private universities: Universidad Católica del Uruguay, Universidad ORT Uruguay, Universidad de la Empresa (www.ude.edu.uy), and Universidad de Montevideo. Education at the University of the Republic was free and, in general, open to all those possessing a bachillerato, or certificate awarded for completion of both cycles of general secondary education. Despite the free tuition, however, access to a university education tended to be limited to children of middle and upper-income families because the need to supplement the family income by working, coupled with the expense of books and other fees, placed a university education out of the reach of many. Moreover, the fact that the only public university was in Montevideo severely limited the ability of those in the interior to attend university unless their families were relatively well off financially. In 1988 about 69 percent of university students were from Montevideo.

The number of university students continued to grow rapidly, from nearly 22,000 in 1970 to over 61,000 in 1988. Of that total, women accounted for about 58 percent. Most courses of study were intended to last from four to six years, but the average time spent at university by a successful student was usually considerably longer. As in the rest of Latin America, maintaining the status of student had various advantages, such as reduced fares on buses and subsidized canteens. This was one reason that the student population was so large yet the number of graduates relatively low. In 1986 only 3,654 students (2,188 women and 1,455 men) graduated from university, whereas 16,878 entered that year. Uruguayans exhibited a strong preference for the disciplines and professions they deemed prestigious, such as law, social science, engineering, medicine, economics, and administration.

Observers continued to note the discrepancy between university training and job opportunities, particularly in the prestigious fields. This gap contributed to the substantial level of emigration of the best-educated young Uruguayan professionals.

== History ==
=== Reforms under military rule, 1973–1985 ===
In 1973, the year in which Uruguay descended into authoritarian rule, major changes were decreed in the education system. The National Council for Education (Consejo Nacional de Educación—Conae) was set up to oversee all three branches of education under the supervision of the executive branch of government. At the same time, the compulsory length of schooling was raised from six to nine years. The secondary curriculum was completely reorganized, as was the pattern of teacher training. Finally, the INET saw its status and budget upgraded. However, overall spending on education fell from 12.2 percent of the central government budget in 1974 to 7.3 percent in 1982.

Enrollments in primary education (both state and private) fell 6 percent from 1968 to 1981. From 1968 to 1982, secondary school enrollments grew 6 percent; however, about half the secondary school students in Montevideo (and 70 percent in the interior) dropped out before receiving any certification. Over the same period, there was a boom in technical schools; enrollments increased 66 percent in the interior and 27 percent in Montevideo. The major cause of this increase was the new ciclo básico (basic cycle), which added three years of compulsory secondary education to the six years of compulsory primary schooling. However, the dropout rate remained about 50 percent. Enrollments in the University of the Republic doubled from 1968 to 1982, but the proportion of students graduating fell to just 8 percent.

In 1984, as something of a parting shot, Uruguay's military government formally granted university status to a Catholic college that had been expanding over the previous decade. This ended the University of the Republic's monopoly, which had lasted since its foundation in 1849. The new Catholic University of Uruguay remained extremely small, however, compared with its rival.

=== Recent years ===
Uruguay, under the initiative of President Tabaré Vázquez, approved and implemented the program called Ceibal project, which is currently running successfully, providing all Primary School children with their own "ceibalita"; as the laptops are affectionately called. In 2010, with the new government of José Mujica Cordano, the program will continue, and is planned to be extended to cover all secondary education children as well. The laptops were developed by a non-governmental organization, One Laptop Per Child (OLPC). Following the ideas of the OLPC, Uruguay was the first country in the world to commit itself and implement a plan to distribute personal computers to every student and teacher in the public education system, with the strategic purpose of improving educational quality in an equity framework.

== See also ==
- Learning Assessment System (SEA - Uruguay)

== Sources ==
- This article incorporates text from a free content work. Licensed under CC-BY-SA IGO 3.0 (license statement/permission). Text taken from Comparative review of National Mobile Learning Initiatives in Latin America: The cases of Costa Rica, Colombia, Peru and Uruguay. Comparative Report; Executive Summary/Abridged version, 9, UNESCO, UNESCO. UNESCO.
