= Ceibal =

Ceibal may refer to:

- Ceibal project, a Uruguayan initiative to implement the "One laptop per child" model
- Seibal (Spanish: Ceibal), an archaeological site of the Maya civilization
