= Physics of Wave Phenomena =

Scientific journal

- Discipline: Wave physics
- Language: English
- Edited by: Ivan A. Shcherbakov

Publication details
- Former name: Physics of Vibrations (1993—2003)
- History: 1993—present
- Publisher: Springer, Pleiades Publishing
- Frequency: Quarterly
- Impact factor: 1.3 (2024)

Standard abbreviations
- ISO 4: Phys. Wave Phenom.

Indexing
- CODEN: PWPHA9
- ISSN: 1541-308X (print); 1934-807X (web)

Links
- Journal homepage; Online access; Online archive

Physics of Wave Phenomena is a peer-reviewed scientific journal co-published quarterly by Springer Science+Business Media and Pleiades Publishing. It covers developments in all branches of wave physics, including optics, acoustics, radiophysics, mechanics, and gravitation. Established in 1993 as a supplement to Bulletin of the Russian Academy of Sciences: Physics under the name Physics of Vibrations, it became a separate journal in 1998. In 2003, it was renamed as Physics of Wave Phenomena. Its current editor-in-chief is Ivan A. Shcherbakov (Russian Academy of Sciences).

== Abstracting and indexing ==
The journal is abstracted and indexed in:

- Inspec
- ProQuest databases
- Science Citation Index Expanded
- Scopus

According to the Journal Citation Reports, the journal has a 2024 impact factor of 1.3.
