= Scienticide =

Policies to repress scientific systems

Scienticide is a concept used to refer to various multifaceted processes or phenomena that lead to the harassment, reduction, or outright destruction of scientific and technological systems in some countries of the world, as well as the exile or abandonment of researchers from their places of training. These can occur for various reasons, such as wars, political repression, lack of opportunities, climate crises, foreign interventions, economic policies, or ideological persecution.

== Etymology ==
The term metaphorically refers to the "murder of science," as it combines the word *science* with the Latin suffix - *cidium*, which comes from the root *caedĕre* ("to kill"). A comparative use of the term has been proposed alongside "femicide", as part of policies aimed at eliminating the scientific and technological systems of a country.

== History ==
The first references to this concept using the English word "scienticide" date back to the 1990s when it was used to refer to the destruction of the network of educational, scientific, and research institutions created by the Anti-Fascist Council for the National Liberation of Yugoslavia between 1942 and 1945. The educational system established was systematically attacked by the Yugoslav Army in the Homeland, commonly known as *Chetniks*, a nationalist, conservative, and Serbian monarchist guerrilla organization. This harassment was referred to as a true scienticide. The term was also used to describe the persecution, murder, or imprisonment in concentration camps of many genetic scientists—such as Nikolai Vavilov— by the former Soviet Union during the 1930s and 1940s.

Years later, this term was used in Portuguese in 2014 to criticize government policies in Portugal related to cuts of 82 million euros from science, driven by then Minister of Education and Science, which was labeled "scienticide" by the opposition.

In Spanish, the concept gained relevance when it began to be formulated and extensively used within Argentine academic circles to refer to and oppose budget cuts and their negative effects on the scientific-technological system that occurred starting in 2016 during Mauricio Macri's government. Thus, during these years, several publications emerged; the first within a free chair at a national university, in newspapers, academic books, and scientific publications. During this period, the concept and word were used as a slogan by those affected by these policies. Subsequently, its use expanded to encompass both loss of sovereignty and neoliberal policies in Latin America, as well as what is commonly referred to as "infocognitive extractivism" of highly qualified scientific personnel by first-world scientific centers, linking it to what is commonly known as "brain drain". A similar process occurred in Brazil during these years when it was described as "scienticides".

At an international level, the term was not significantly used until the Russian invasion of Ukraine in February 2022, which significantly affected science in that country. This greater dissemination occurred following an article in *Nature*, which echoed accusations made by the National Academy of Sciences of Ukraine against Russia for the deliberate destruction of science in Ukraine. This process was described with the concept of "scienticide". In this latter case, in addition to the intentional destruction of a large amount of scientific infrastructure, by March 2024 at least 124 scientists had been counted as dead during the war; 12% of scientists from Ukraine had emigrated to other countries; while 1,443 scientific buildings had been damaged.

At the same time, in 2024 the concept was forcefully used again in Argentina due to disinvestment policies affecting the scientific-technological system and verbal attacks against the scientific community by President Javier Milei on different occasions. This was described in multiple national and international media outlets. At the same time, there has been an increase in persecution against scientists and researchers for ideological reasons. Important international science and technology journals such as Nature and Science have referred to this issue. The latter journal placed Argentina alongside other countries experiencing brain drain for various reasons such as Syria, Turkey, Ethiopia, Iran, Afghanistan, and Ukraine.
