= Alberto Boerger =

German biologist (1881–1957)

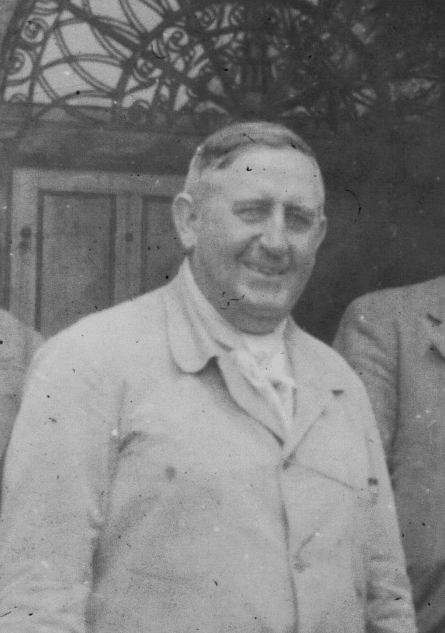
- Boerger in 1937
- Born: November 4, 1881; Förde, Westphalia, German Empire
- Died: March 28, 1957 (aged 75); La Estanzuela, Uruguay
- Education: Universidad de Bonn
- Known for: Applied genetics, phytotechnology, development of wheats that triplicate the yields of Rio de la Plata region (Uruguay, Argentine and south of Brazil)
- Spouse: María Elisa Bülle Marcor
- Scientific career
- Fields: Plant breeding, phytotechnology, crop rotation
- Workplaces: Phytotechnical Institute and National Seedlings (1919–1957); Center for Agricultural Research Alberto Boerger (CIIAB) (1957–1990); National Institute of Agricultural Research (INIA, Uruguay)
- Doctoral advisor: Dr. Theodor Remy

Albert Boerger (known as Alberto Boerger in South America; November 4, 1881 – March 28, 1957) was a German scientist who worked in the field of phytotechnology. In 1911, the government of Uruguay hired him to breed plants in that country, taking as starting points the experiences of the United States and Germany. He arrived in Uruguay in 1912. After two years of research in experimental stations at Toledo (Department of Canelones) and Bañados de Medina (Department of Cerro Largo), he was transferred to the experimental station at La Estanzuela (Department of Colonia del Sacramento) with his collaborators, who conducted research for Uruguay and Argentina. Boerger's studies in plant breeding — especially wheats — made outstanding contributions to plant science.

== Biography ==
=== Germany ===
Albert Boerger was born on November 4, 1881, in the town of Förde, Westphalia, German Empire), son of farmers Teodoro Boerger and Maria Kersling who worked as laborers. In 1902, he began his studies in Natural Sciences and General Engineering in Hannover; then he studied agronomy and political economics at the Prussian Royal Academy of Agriculture of Bonn University, where he specialized in phytotechnology. He received a PhD from the University of Giessen (Germany).

=== Work in Uruguay ===
In the second term of José Batlle y Ordoñez, this Uruguayan president wanted to industrialize the country. He encouraged changes in the agricultural sector, among which was the incorporation of the best technicians from abroad. For instance, Drs. Alexander Backhaus and Daniel Salmon directed the Faculty of Agronomy and Faculty of Veterinary Medicine of the University of the Republic, respectively.

Albert Boerger, after working as a technical director of seedlings in a Saxon company, in 1910 entered as assistant of the chair of phytotechnology (University of Bonn) of his former teacher Theodor Remy. In the same year, he was part of an official German government mission to study grasslands and forage production in Austria, Denmark, Hungary, Switzerland and Sweden. And after that, in the stage of constitution of the Agronomic Stations in Uruguay, he was contracted by the Government of Uruguay as a teacher and senior researcher by recommendation of Alexander Backhaus.

Albert Boerger arrived in Uruguay on March 5, 1912, with his young assistant, Enrique Klein. The first field of activity of the two German scientists was the nursery of Toledo (Department of Canelones), now known under the name of National nursery Dr. Alejandro Gallinal (Department of Canelones, Uruguay). According to Bonfanti (2010), this was the worst documented period of Boerger and Klein's activities in Uruguay, although the seed selection must have started in this period, work that in April 1913 was transferred to the Agricultural Station of Bañados de Medina, now known under the name of Station Experimental Prof. Bernardo Rosengurtt (Cerro Largo). An experimental station with six hectares, where six experiments were organized with pre-selected materials in the nursery of Toledo. In this first period, his first investigations were related to the selection of wheats, due to problems of adaptation of the foreign wheats to the conditions of Uruguay.

=== Scientific research from La Estanzuela for the region ===
On March 5, 1914, Alberto Boerger arrived as Director, and Eng. Agr. Enrique Klein as head of the plant breeding division of the "La Estanzuela" (agronomic station, currently known as the Alberto Boerger INIA La Estanzuela Experimental Station) in the Department of Colonia, Uruguay.

After six years of efforts, in 1918, from La Estanzuela, Boerger's research team released the first Uruguayan wheat varieties, genetic selection based on the selection of native seeds. These came from the natural selection of seeds imported by European immigrants in Uruguay.

The successes achieved by Boerger and Klein in the early years with wheat varieties. A work begun in 1912 with 377 selections of wheats that highlightedthe plant breeding as a powerful tool for improve the agricultural yields, which led in 1919 to the recategorization of La Estanzuela by legislation such as Phytotechnical Institute and National Seedling.

Enrique Klein's uneasy personality, coupled with his successful experience with the selection of barley (Cervecería Argentina at Quilmes, Argentina) made his contract with the government of Uruguay until 1920; then he emigrated to Argentine on May 1, 1919, to the Argentine breeder of Agricultural Plants (at the moment known like Criadero Klein). This physical separation of the two disciples of the Bonn University implied in the facts an expansion of the influence and the scientific / technological development, since the centers (the Estanzuela and Criadero Argentine of Agricultural Plants) maintained the contact and their collaboration until today.

The yield of the wheats generated in this period were of relevance for both Uruguay and Argentina. Reports from 1920 to 1924 indicate that one-fifth of Argentina's wheat surface was based on seeds selected by the works of Boerger and Klein in La Estanzuela.

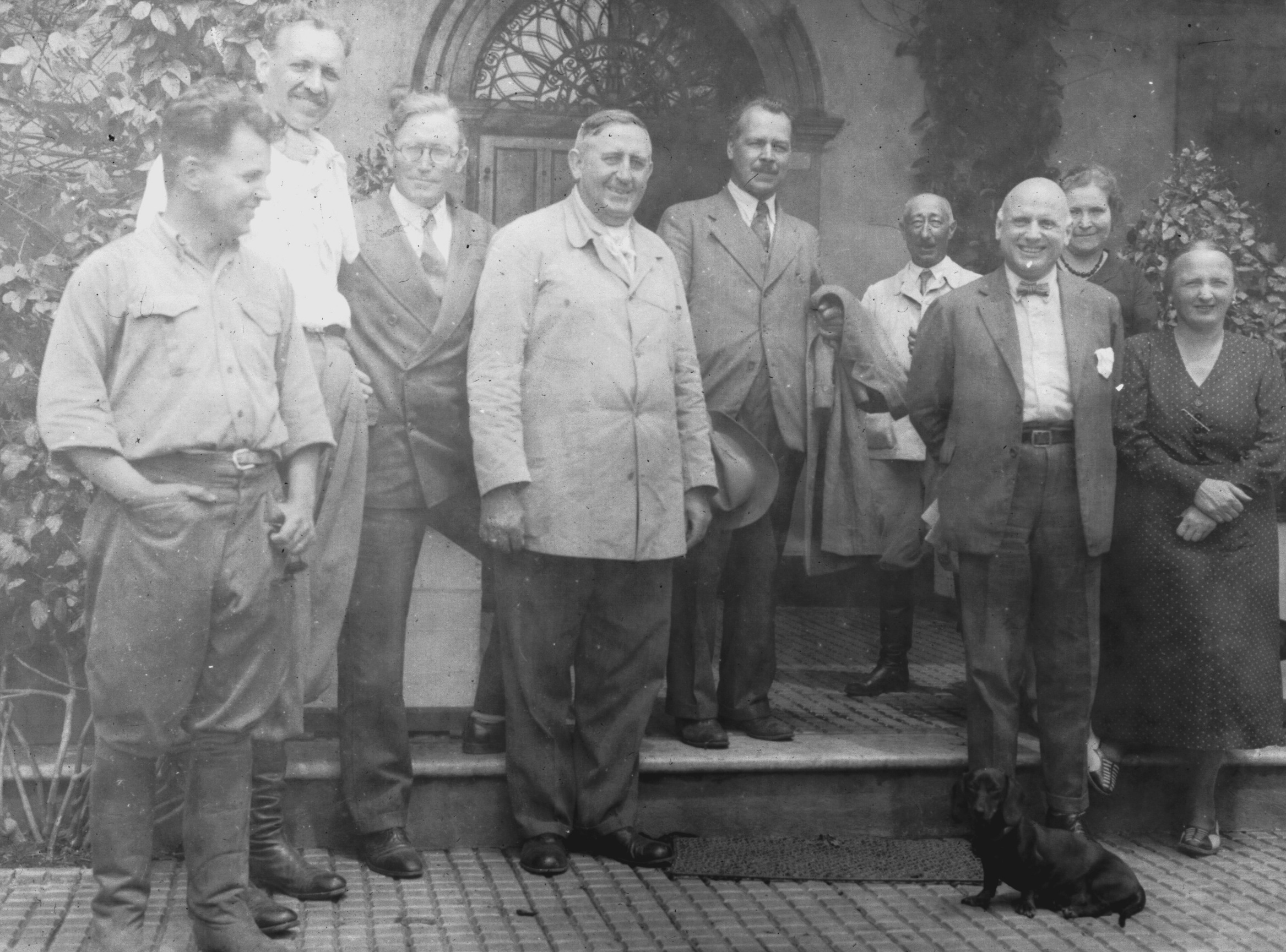
In 1937, the Russian botanist and geneticist Nikolai Vavilov visited Boerger in La Estanzuela

The Estanzuela, under the direction of Boerger, attempted to reflect in his organization with the Kaiser Wilhelm Institute for Breeding Research of Münchenberg (Germany). The Kaiser Wilhelm Institut was a scientific organization with similar aims to its predecessor after World War II, the Max Planck Society. In the period that Albert Boerger assumes as Director the Kaiser Wilhelm Institut für Züchtungsforschung was a scientific center of worldwide recognition, for example was its Director Erwin Baur, now recognized as the father of plant virology. Boerger aimed to create a research center with capacities to establish links of scientific / technological cooperation with practical agriculture, and transfer the transfer to producers to universities. Characteristic that would change in the work of the Estanzuela after its death on March 28, 1957, when the experimental station changed its name to Center of Agricultural Research Dr. Albert Boerger in 1961.

=== Eponyms ===
- Experimental Station "Dr. Alberto Boerger" INIA La Estanzuela, de INIA, Department of Colonia del Sacramento, Uruguay
- Square "Dr. Alberto Boerger", Artigas avenue, Colonia del Sacramento, Department of Colonia del Sacramento, Uruguay
- School Nº 55 "Dr. Alberto Boerger", Colonia del Sacramento, Department of Colonia del Sacramento, Uruguay
- Colony of farmers "Dr. Alberto Boerger", Department of Paysandú, Uruguay

== Personal life ==
He was married to María Elisa Bülle Marcor, born in Guaymas, México on February 9, 1876, the daughter of the German citizen Adolfo Bülle Tamm and the Mexican citizen Elisa Marcor Basozábal. She died in Montevideo on September 11, 1950, aged 74.

== Awards ==
- Gold Medal of the Sociedad Rural Argentina
- Professor ad honorem of the Faculty of Agronomy of the University of the Republic of Uruguay
- Knight of the Order of the Southern Cross of Brazil
- Silver Platelet of the Institute of Cultural Relations of Germany with the outside; Professor honoris cause of the School of Agronomy Eliseu Maciel of Pelotas, Rio Grande do Sul, Brazil
- Professor honoris causa of the University of Rio Grande do Sul, Porto Alegre; Academic honorary of the National Academy of Agronomy and Veterinary of the Republic Argentine
- Officer in the Order of Oranje Nassau, Netherlands
- Honorary citizen of the Municipality of Grevenbrück (Westphalia) Germany
- Great Cross of the Order of Merits granted by the government of the Federal Republic of Germany; a corresponding member of the Central German Center for Agronomic Research in Braunschweig – Völkenrode
- Technical consultant of the Directory of Scientific Agriculture of the Industrial Technical institute of Rio de Janeiro, Brazil
- Member of Scientific Council of the International Institute of Agriculture of Rome; member of Leopoldina Academy of Naturalists of Germany; Socio honorario de la Biology Society of Río Grande do Sul, Brazil
