= Elena Barulina =

Russian botanist and geneticist

Elena Ivanovna Barulina
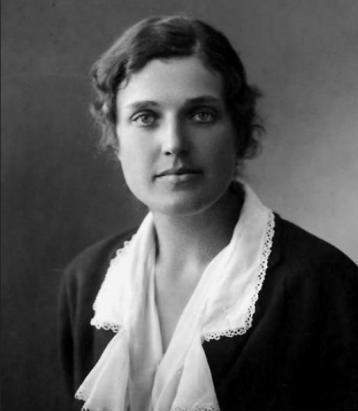
- Born: 1895; Saratov, Russian Empire
- Died: 9 July 1957 (aged 61–62); Saratov, RSFSR, Soviet Union
- Citizenship: USSR; Russian Empire
- Education: Saratov Agricultural Institute
- Known for: Genetics of lentils
- Spouse: Nikolai Vavilov
- Scientific career
- Fields: Botany; Genetics; Agronomy
- Workplaces: Institute of Plant Industry
- Author abbrev. (botany): Barulina

Elena Ivanovna Barulina (Russian: Елена Ивановна Барулина; 1895 – 9 July 1957) was a Russian and Soviet botanist and geneticist who conducted pioneering research on lentils and their wild relatives. In 1930, she published the first map of their international distribution, in a 317-page monograph that became the standard reference for researchers. The standard author abbreviation Barulina is used to indicate this person as the author when citing a botanical name.

== Early life ==
Barulina was born in 1895 in Saratov, a major port on the Volga River. Her father was a manager in the port. After graduating from gymnasium in 1913 (with a silver medal) she entered the Faculty of Agronomy at the University of Saratov.

== Career ==
One of her professors, the Russian botanist and geographer Nikolai Vavilov, recommended her for graduate work and later invited her to accompany him to St. Petersburg where he would become Director of the Bureau of Applied Botany (now the Vavilov Institute of Plant Industry). Once there, she became assistant head of the institute's experimental seed station. In 1926, she married Vavilov.

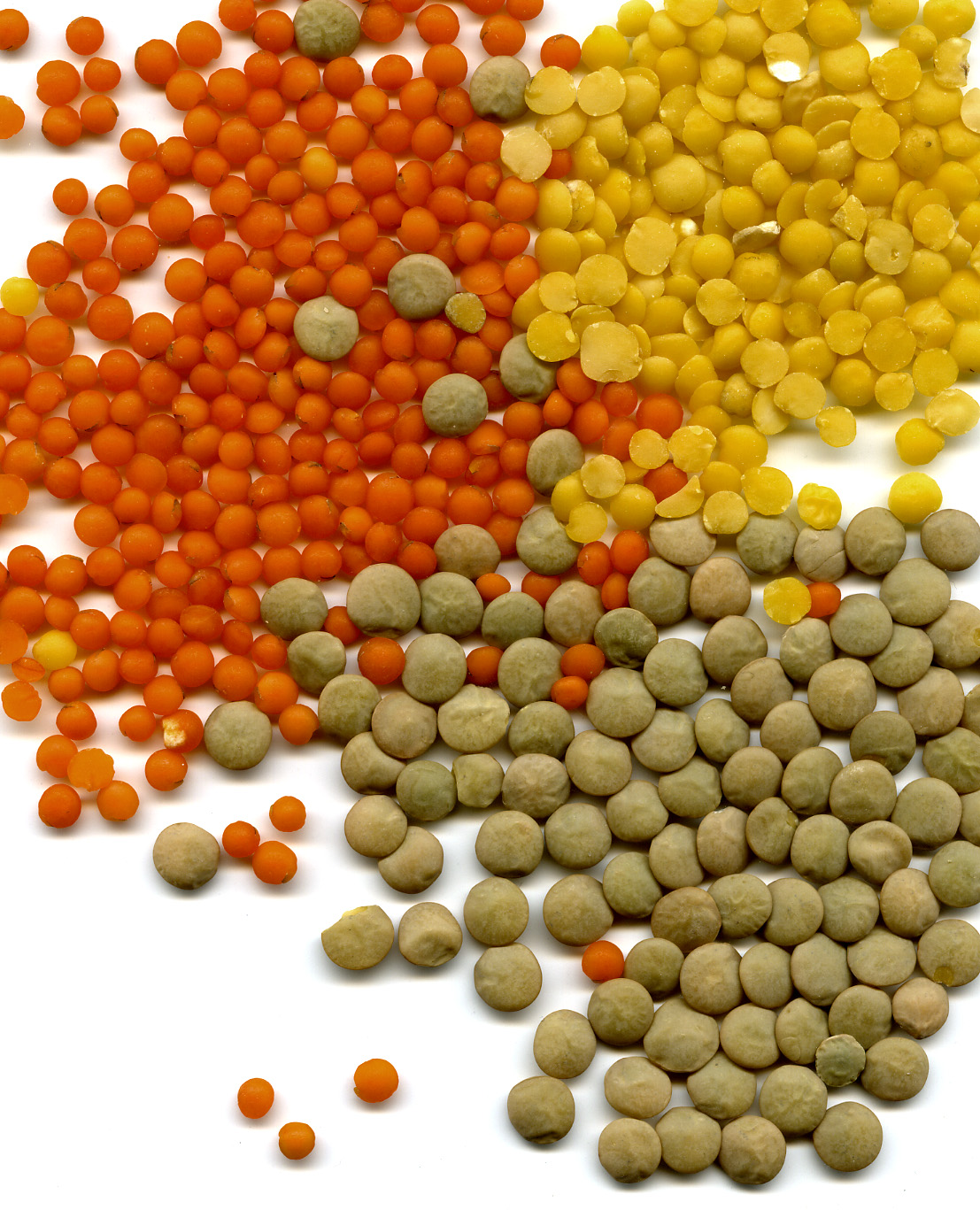
Seeds of Lens culinaris, the cultivated lentil. Barulina studied them with their wild relatives and ancestors.

Barulina became the center's expert on lentils, eventually classifying them into six groups. Based on the wild species found in association with early cultivars, she postulated that modern cultivated lentils (Lens culinaris) originated from a wild species Lens orientalis (now tentatively classified as Vicia orientalis.)

In 1930, Barulina published a 319-page monograph of her research in Lentils of U.S.S.R. and of other countries as a supplement to the Bulletin of Applied Botany. Her 1930 work became the standard reference for researchers studying lentils. It was the first to map the international distribution of different species of lentils.

In 1937, Barulina later summarized her lentil research in Volume IV of Flore des Plantes cultivées.

In addition to her scholarly work on lentils, Barulina led major plant-collecting expeditions to Crimea in 1923 and to Georgia in 1933. She also participated in other research at the institute. As one of the institute's leading geneticists, Barulina's research extended beyond work with lentils. The standard author abbreviation "Barulina" is used to indicate her as the author when citing botanical names.

== Later years ==
Stalin's belief in the agronomical theories of Trofim Lysenko led to Vavilov's arrest and imprisonment in 1941. Lysenko took over the institute. Barulina and her son with Vavilov (Yuri, born 1928) returned to Saratov where they spent the rest of World War II in great poverty. Not knowing that her husband had also been moved to a prison in Saratov, Barulina sent food parcels for him to Moscow, which never reached him.

Vavilov died in 1943 but was rehabilitated in 1955. Barulina was then able to begin work editing his papers for publication, but she died on 9 July 1957.

According to her biographer Margarita Vishnyakova, writing in 2007, Barulina was "a famous scientist, an expert on the genetic resources of cultivated plants. Her works to this day have not lost their relevance and are widely cited in the world scientific literature."
