= La Cruz, Florida =

La Cruz
- Village
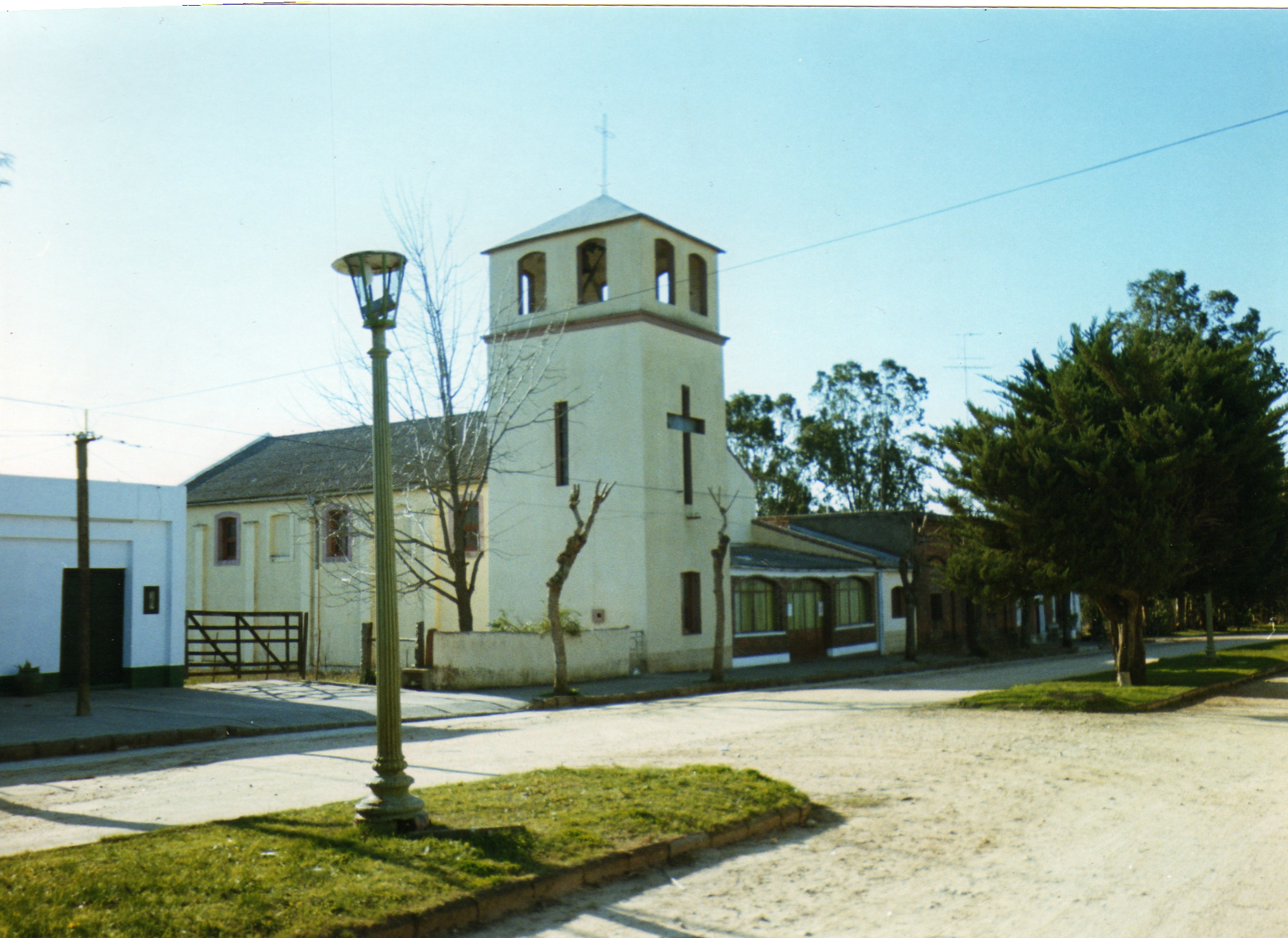
- Church in La Cruz

- Location in Uruguay
- Coordinates: 33°55′45″S 56°14′6″W
- Country: Uruguay
- Department: Florida Department

Population (2011)
  - Total: 747
- Time zone: UTC -3
- Postal code: 94004
- Dial plan: +598 435 (+5 digits)

La Cruz is a village in the Florida Department of Uruguay.

== Geography ==
It is located in the centre of Florida Department, on the east side of Ruta 5, 19 kilometres (12 mi) northwest of Florida, in an area known as Santa Teresa.

== History ==
On 23 November 1929, the status of the group of houses here was elevated to "Pueblo" (village) by the Act of Ley Nº 8.497.

== Population ==
In 2011 La Cruz had a population of 747.

Year	Population
1963	745
1975	620
1985	618
1996	702
2004	726
2011	747

Source: Instituto Nacional de Estadística de Uruguay

== Places of worship ==
- Exaltation of the Cross Chapel (Roman Catholic)
