= Mendoza Chico =

- Village
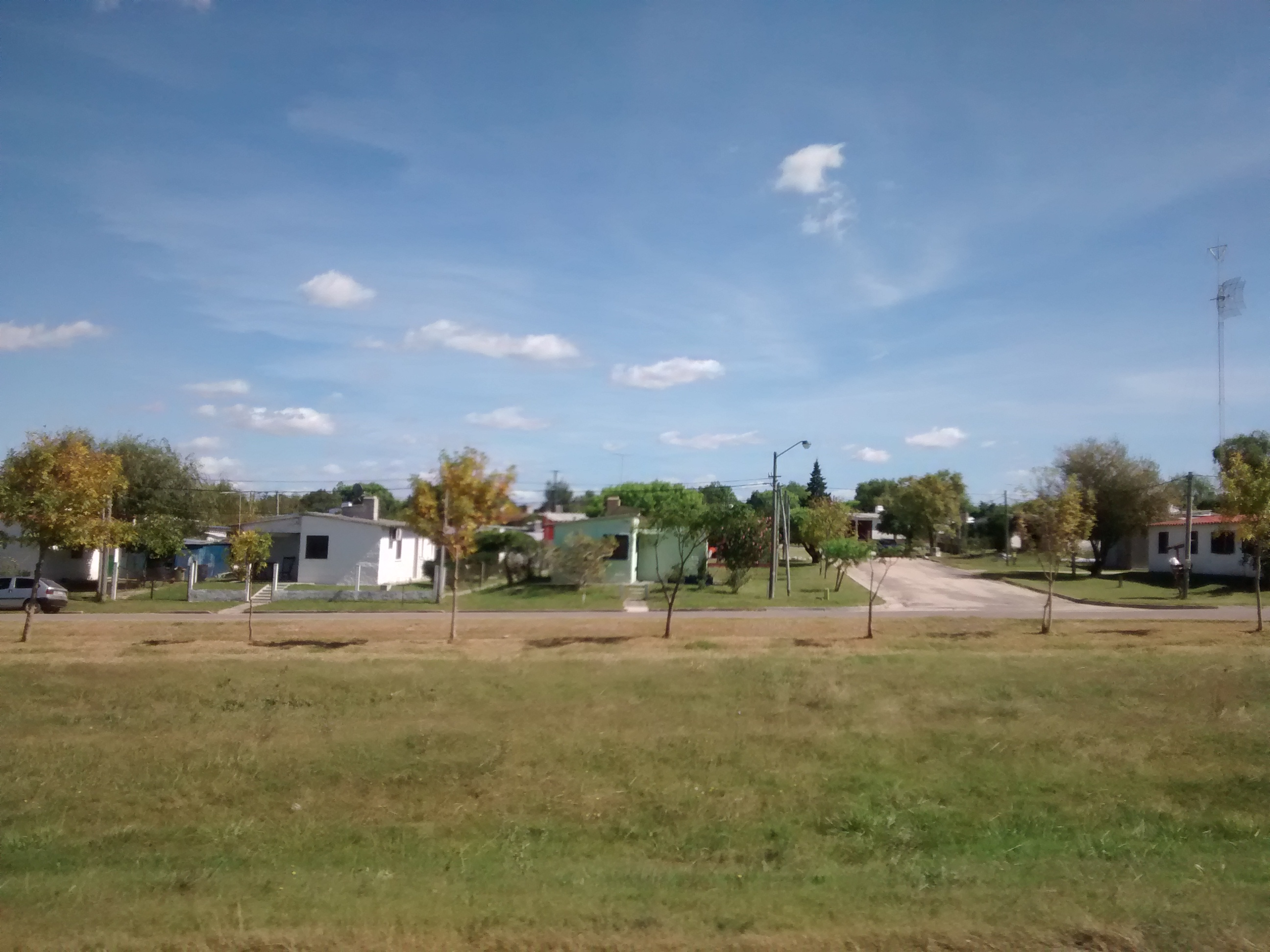

- Location in Uruguay
- Coordinates: 34°12′0″S 56°13′0″W
- Country: Uruguay
- Department: Florida Department

Population (2011)
  - Total: 810
- Time zone: UTC -3
- Postal code: 94006
- Dial plan: +598 4339 (+4 digits)

Mendoza Chico is a village or populated centre in the Florida Department of southern-central Uruguay.

== Geography ==
It is located on Ruta 5, 4.5 kilometres (2.8 mi) north of Mendoza Grande and 17 kilometres (11 mi) south of Florida.

== Population ==
In 2011 Mendoza Chico had a population of 810.

Year	Population
1963	232
1975	446
1985	399
1996	574
2004	776
2011	810

Source: Instituto Nacional de Estadística de Uruguay
