= Florida Department =

Florida
- Department
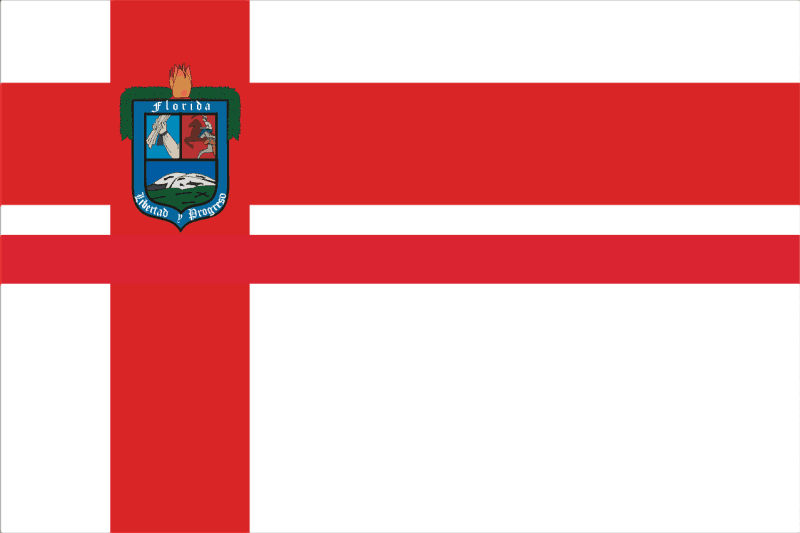
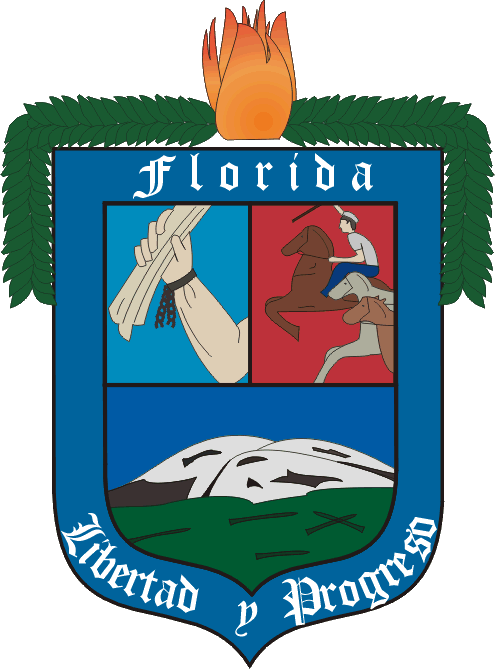
- Flag Coat of arms

- Location of Florida Department in Uruguay
- Coordinates (Florida): 34°6′S 56°13′W
- Country: Uruguay
- Inception: 1856
- Capital of Department: Florida

Government
  - Intendant: Carlos Enciso
  - Ruling party: Partido Nacional

Area
  - Total: 10,417 km^{2} (4,022 sq mi)
- Elevation: 99 m (325 ft)

Population (2023 census)
  - Total: 70,325
  - Density: 6.7510/km^{2} (17.485/sq mi)
- Demonym: Floridense
- Time zone: UTC-3 (UYT)
- Area code: 435
- ISO 3166 code: UY-FD
- Website: www.imf.gub.uy

Florida (Spanish pronunciation: [floˈɾiða]) is a department of Uruguay. Its capital is Florida. It is located in the south of the central part of the country with Durazno Department to its north, the departments of Treinta y Tres and Lavalleja to its east, Canelones Department to its south and the departments of Flores and San José to its west.

== History ==
The flag of the independent Provincia Oriental approved by the Congreso de la Florida in 1825.

Florida Department was formed on 10 July 1856 from part of San José Department.

In 1760 the first populated place in its territory started by creating a fortress, the Fortín del Pintado, and in 1809 the "Villa de San Fernando de la Florida" was created. During the events of the Independence of Uruguay, a temporary government was set up in this town, and on 25 August 1825, the Congreso de la Florida proclaimed the three fundamental laws of the new independent country.

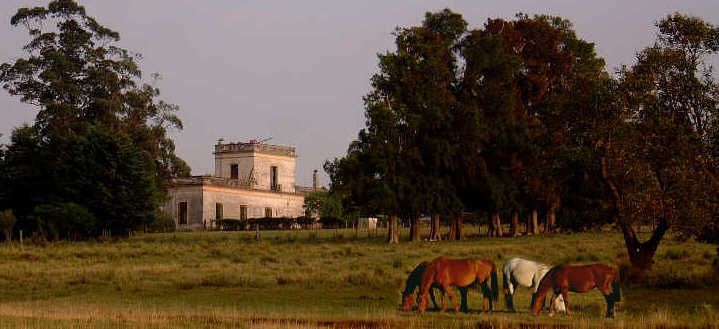
Historic Estancia, Southern Departamento Florida

== Geography ==
Most of the border of the department with Durazno Department in the north is formed by the Yí River, with many of its tributaries flowing in the north part of the department. From east to west, these are the streams: Arroyo del Pescado, Arroyo Molles del Pescado, Arroyo Illescas, Arroyo Sauce, Arroyo Mansavillagra, Arroyo Timote, Arroyo Molles del Timote, Arroyo de Castro, Arroyo Sarandí and Arroyo Sauce de Villaneuva, which also forms the border near the city of Durazno. The border then follows Arroyo Batoví a tributary of Arroyo Maciel, the later forming big part of the border of the department with Flores Department to the west and is itself a tributary of Yí River.

Further south, separating the department from San José Department to the west, is the stream Arroyo de la Virgen, a tributary of Santa Lucia River. The later forms the south border of the department, separating it from Canelones Department, with its tributaries flowing through the south part of the department. From east to west, these are: Arroyo Chamaré and Arroyo Casurá, both of which are part of the east border of the department, Arroyo Chamizo, Arroyo de Arias and the Santa Lucia Chico River, with Arroyo de Pintadito as its tributary. A dam in the course of the Santa Lucia Chico River near 25 de Mayo and Cardal forms the Paso de Severino Reservoir.

Crossing the middle of the department from west to east and separating the streams of the north with those of the south, is the Cuchilla Grande Inferior hillrange, which joins the Cuchilla Grande hillrange in the east of the department.

== Demographics ==
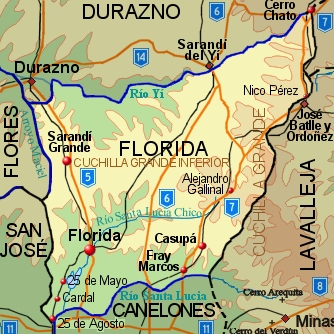
Topographic map of Florida Department showing main populated places and roads

As of the census of 2011, Florida Department had a population of 67,048 (32,953 male and 34,095 female) and 29,437 households.

Demographic data for Florida Department in 2010:

- Population growth rate: 0.431%
- Birth Rate: 13.92 births/1,000 people
- Death Rate: 9.56 deaths/1,000 people
- Average age: 33.5 (32.4 male, 34.6 female)
- Life Expectancy at Birth:
  - Total population: 77.43 years
  - Male: 74.28 years
  - Female: 80.91 years
- Average per household income: 21,978 pesos/month
- Urban per capita income: 9,039 pesos/month

2010 Data Source:

Main Urban Centres
Other towns and villages
Population stated according to the 2011 census.

City / Town	Population
Florida	33,639
Sarandí Grande	6,130
Casupá	2,402
Fray Marcos	2,398
Veinticinco de Mayo	1,852
Veinticinco de Agosto	1,849
Alejandro Gallinal	1,357
Cardal	1,202
Nico Pérez	1,030

Town / Village	Population
Capilla del Sauce	835
Mendoza Chico	810
La Cruz	747
Mendoza	730
Chamizo	540
Cerro Chato	409
Independencia	396

Rural population

According to the 2011 census, Florida department has a rural population of 9,101.

== See also ==
- List of populated places in Uruguay#Florida Department
- Detailed map of Florida Department
  showing all populated places
  and secondary roads.
  See full size version in Commons.
