= Chaucer (crater) =

Lunar impact crater

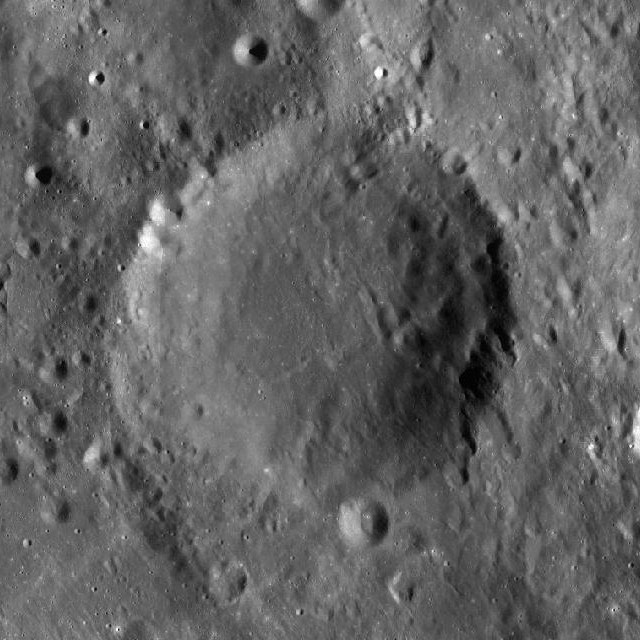
- LRO WAC image
- Coordinates: 3.7°N 140.0°E
- Diameter: 45.48 km (28.26 mi)
- Depth: Unknown
- Colongitude: 141° at sunrise
- Formation: Nectarian
- Eponym: Geoffrey Chaucer

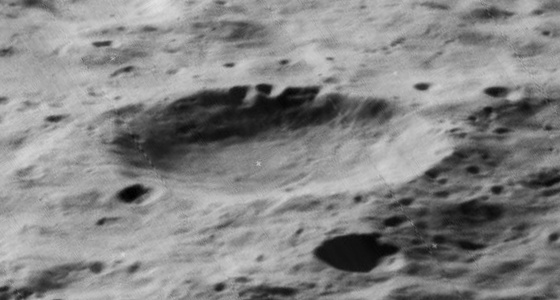
Oblique Lunar Orbiter 5 image

Chaucer is a lunar impact crater that is located to the west of the walled plain Hertzsprung, on the far side of the Moon. It lies to the northwest of the crater Vavilov and east of the Tsander–Kibal'chich crater pair. This formation dates to the Nectarian period on the lunar geologic timescale. It is a circular crater with a slightly eroded outer rim. The interior floor is nearly featureless, with only a few tiny craterlets marking the surface.

This formation is named after the English poet and author Geoffrey Chaucer (c. 1340–1400). Its designation was officially adopted by the International Astronomical Union in 1970.

== Satellite craters ==
By convention these features are identified on lunar maps by placing the letter on the side of the crater midpoint that is closest to Chaucer.

Chaucer	Latitude	Longitude	Diameter
B	6.5° N	137.4° W	27 km
P	1.8° N	141.3° W	13 km
