= Veinticinco de Mayo, Uruguay =

Veinticinco de Mayo 25 de Mayo
- Town
- Location in Uruguay
- Coordinates: 34°11′23″S 56°20′24″W
- Country: Uruguay
- Department: Florida Department

Population (2011)
  - Total: 1,852
- Time zone: UTC -3
- Postal code: 94005
- Dial plan: +598 4339 (+4 digits)

Veinticinco de Mayo is a town in the Florida Department of southern-central Uruguay.

== Geography ==
The town is located on Route 76, 6 kilometres (3.7 mi) east of its intersection with Route 77. The railroad track Montevideo - Florida passes through the village. The stream Arroyo Isla Mala, tributary of Arroyo Santa Lucía Chico, flows along the west and north limits of the village, forming a lake or wetland to the east side of it.

== History ==
Its original name was "Isla Mala" and it was recognized as a recently created populated centre by a decree of 1 September 1875. It was renamed to its present name and declared a "Pueblo" (village) on 17 July 1918 by the Act of Ley N° 6.196. Its status was elevated to "Villa" (town) on 28 January 1985 by the Act of Ley N° 15.706.

== Population ==
In 2011, Veinticinco de Mayo had a population of 1,852.

Year	Population
1908	4,884
1963	1,692
1975	1,874
1985	1,834
1996	1,931
2004	1,845
2011	1,852

Source: Instituto Nacional de Estadística de Uruguay

== Places of worship ==
- Immaculate Conception Parish Church (Roman Catholic)
