= Vavilov (crater) =

Crater on the Moon

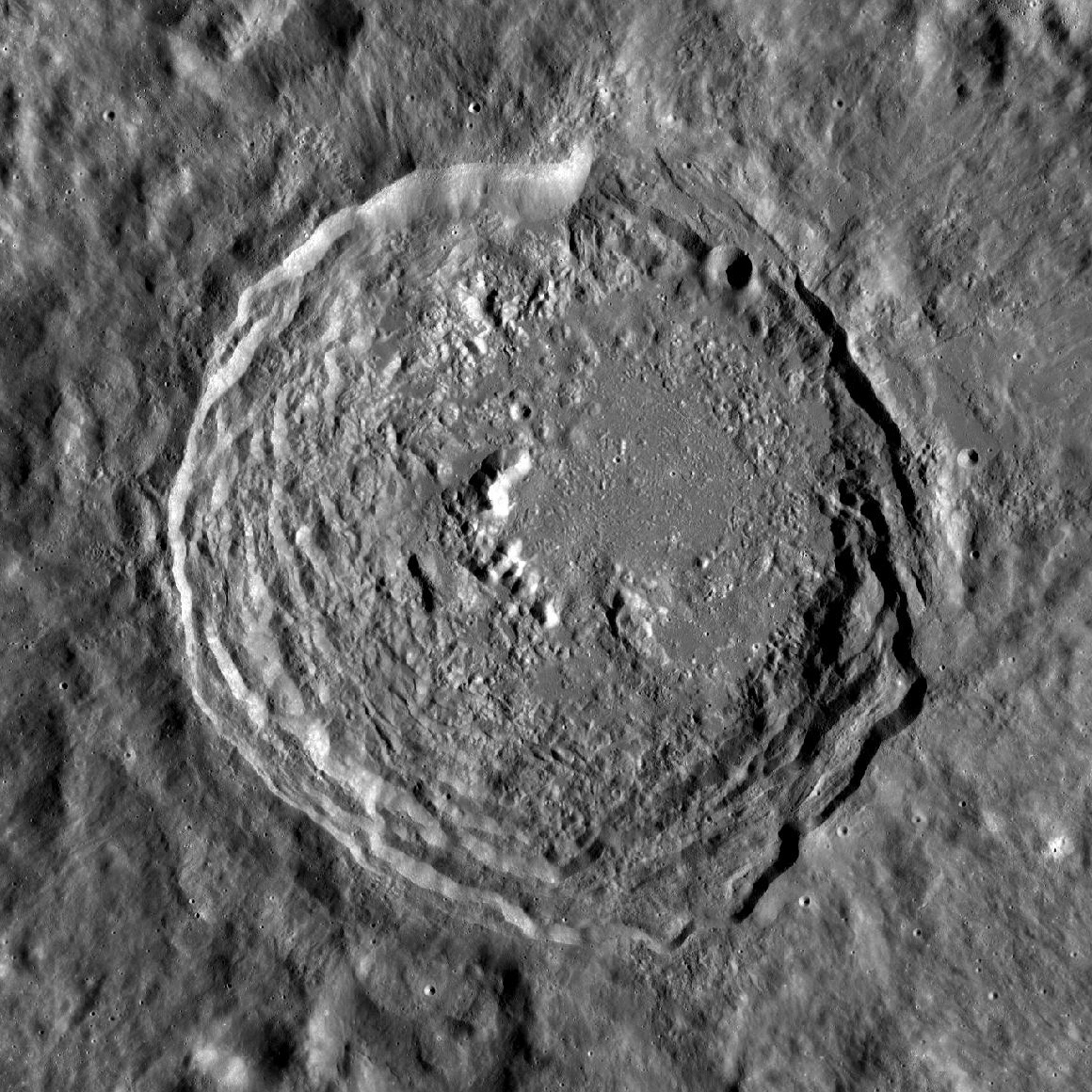
- LRO WAC image
- Coordinates: 0.8°S 137.9°W
- Diameter: 98.22 km
- Depth: Unknown
- Colongitude: 139° at sunrise
- Formation: Copernican
- Eponym: Nikolai I. Vavilov; Sergei I. Vavilov

Vavilov is a prominent impact crater that is located to the west of the walled plain named Hertzsprung. It is located on the far side of the Moon and cannot be viewed directly from the Earth. About a crater diameter to the northwest is the smaller Chaucer, and farther to the southwest is Sechenov.

The crater is named after Nikolai and Sergei Vavilov, brothers and prominent Soviet scientists. This designation was officially adopted by the International Astronomical Union in 1970.

== Description ==
This formation is dated to the Copernican period of the lunar geologic timescale. It is a relatively young impact that still retains the faint remnants of a ray system. Just outside the rim is a shadowed area, with the rays beginning about one-third of a crater diameter distant. The faint rays extend for several crater diameters in all directions.

Vavilov is a well-defined feature that has undergone a minimum of erosion due to subsequent impacts. The outer rim is roughly circular, with a pair of slight outward bulges to the southeast. The inner walls of the rim display several terraces, particularly to the southeast.

The interior floor is roughly level, with a central ridge offset to the west of the midpoint, and some low hills in the southeast. Anorthosite with a very low mafic abundance and the infrared spectrum of pure crystalline plagioclase have been identified on the central peak. The crystal plagioclase is also found on the northeast floor and north wall. The region to the west on the outer rim are some of the highest areas near the equator on the Moon.

== Satellite craters ==
By convention these features are identified on lunar maps by placing the letter on the side of the crater midpoint that is closest to Vavilov.

Feature	Latitude	Longitude	Diameter	Ref
Vavilov D	0.1° S	137.1° W	96.2 km	WGPSN
Vavilov K	5.2° S	135.5° W	25.59 km	WGPSN
Vavilov P	3.4° S	139.6° W	22.71 km	WGPSN

== Gallery ==
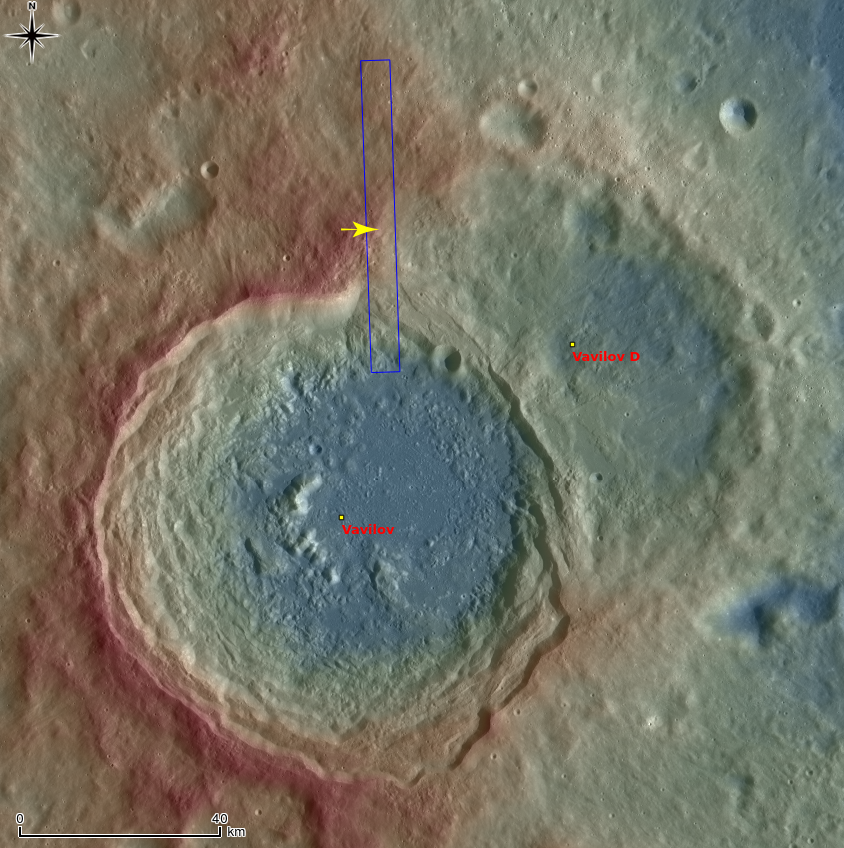
Color topographic map of Vavilov and Vavilov D

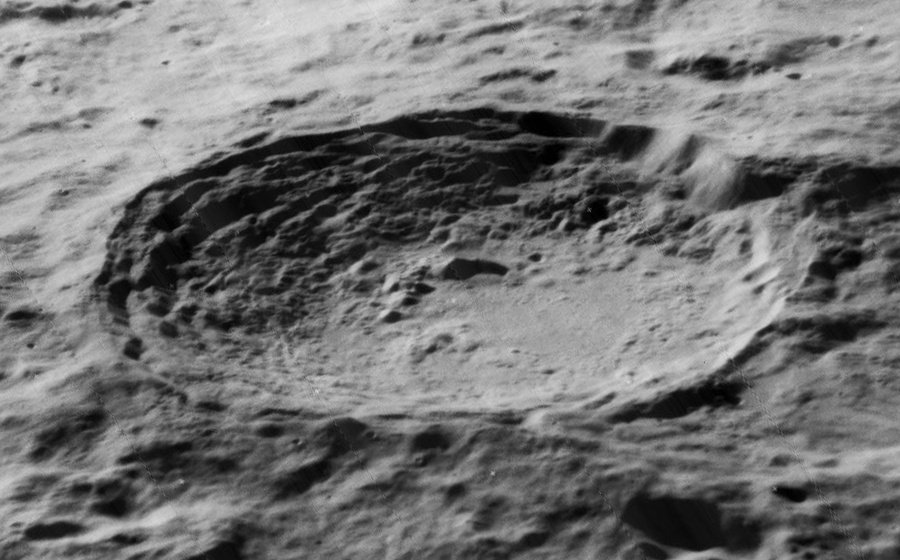
Oblique Lunar Orbiter 5 image

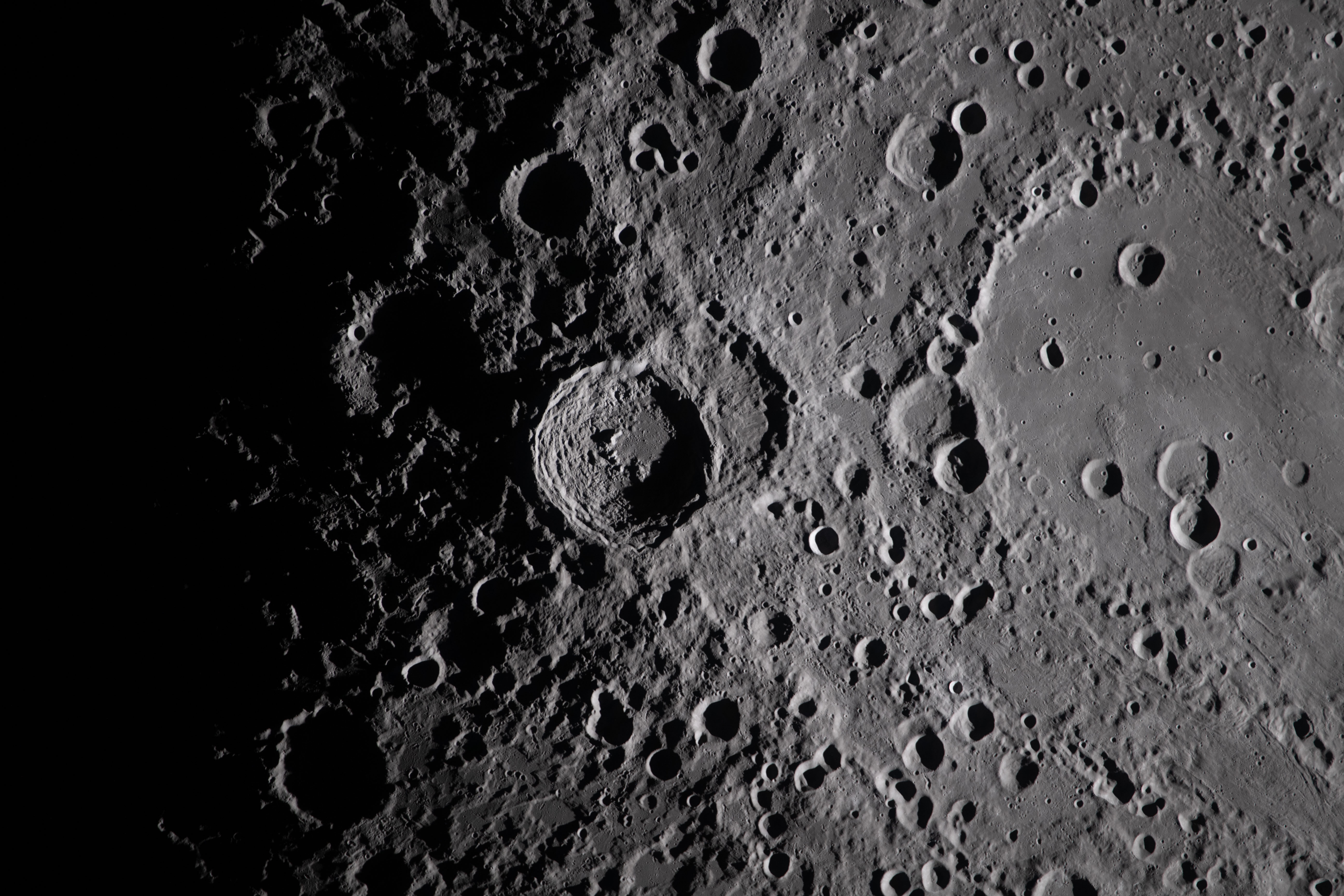
Artemis 2 image with Vavilov at center

== See also ==
- 2862 Vavilov, asteroid
