= Learning Assessment System (SEA - Uruguay) =

Departamento de Evaluación de Aprendizajes
- Type: public institution
- Location: Montevideo, Uruguay
- Website: SEA

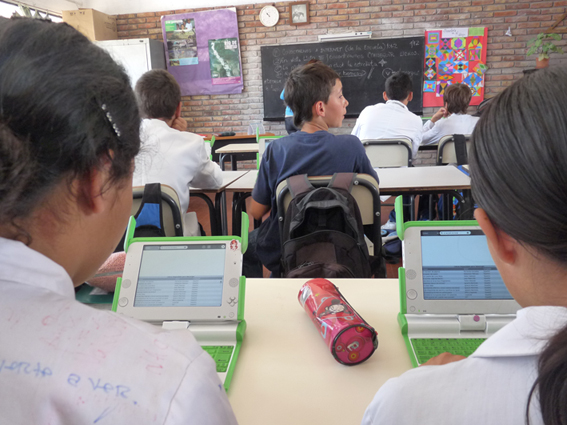
Uruguayan students with XO

The Learning Assessment System (SEA-Sistema de Evaluación de Aprendizaje) operates in ANEP (National Administration of Public Education) in Uruguay. It works with the Technical Inspection of Elementary and Secondary Education to create assessment tests that are applied nationwide, in order to generate a common reference framework on the students learning from their third year of school to third year of high school, to promote reflection among teachers and analysis about the teaching and learning aspects considered in the tests. It uses assessments tools with activities designed by teachers, technicians and specialists in evaluation.

Uruguay is the first Latin American country to do formative assessments online on a massive scale. The application mode uses computers and connectivity provided by Plan Ceibal, which allows a great coverage, instant results and great savings on paper. An important aspect to highlight is the work doing after the application of tests, promoted by SEA and run by education authorities, taken into account results to improve education policies.

== SEA in the Educational System ==
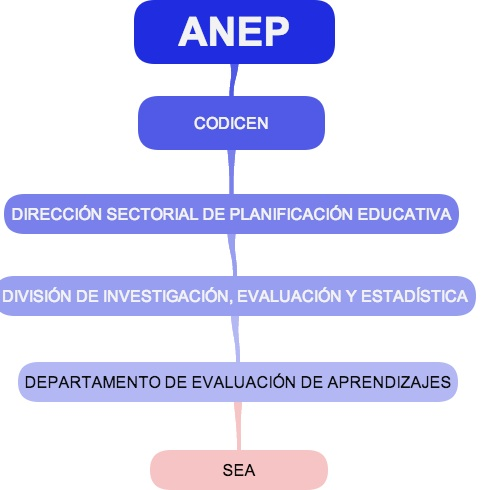

=== History ===
In 2007, the Department of Learning Assessment Division of Research Evaluation and Statistics initiated activities with the Technical Inspection of CEIP (Council on Early Childhood and Elementary) oriented towards a learning assessment system applicable to all students in the whole country. To this aim it was designed, developed and implemented reading and writing tests in first years as a new experience of evaluation system mode, apply independently and built up from the participation and joint efforts of different technical levels of the education system.

This same year, began the experience of Plan Ceibal, which, within two years, would provide computers to all students and teachers in public schools, and connectivity. Thus, the idea of using this technology to enhance the educational use of the XO (the computer that initiated the Plan Ceibal), therefore the usefulness of the machines in the classroom and its possibilities to improve evaluations, arises.

In 2008, the technical team DIEE (Dirección de Investigación y Evaluación Educativa), in conjunction with Inspectors and Teachers of Mathematics, began the construction and conceptual references of tests for students in Secondary Education in the mathematical area.
