= Mendoza, Uruguay =

Mendoza Mendoza Grande
- Village
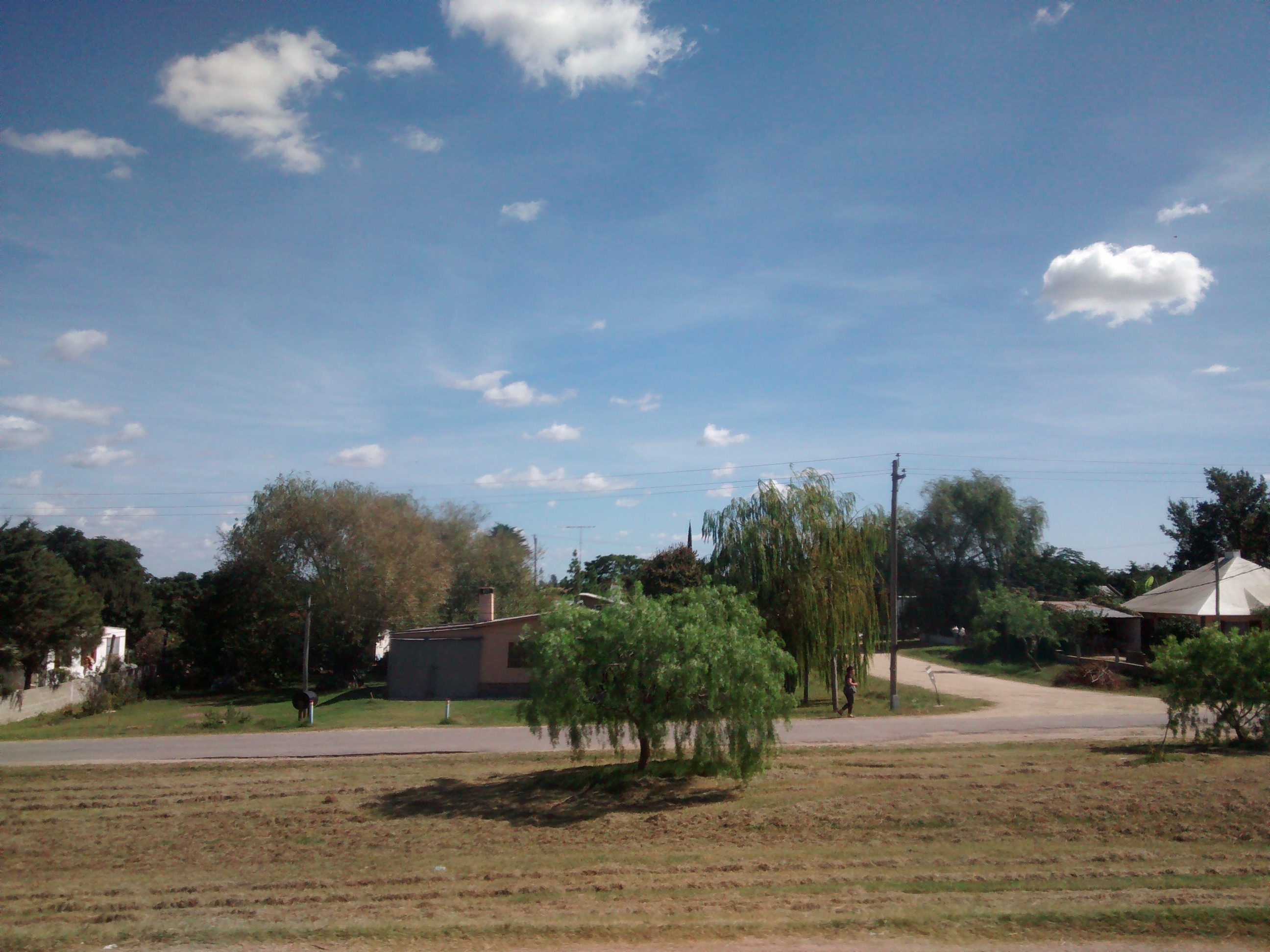

- Location in Uruguay
- Coordinates: 34°17′0″S 56°13′0″W
- Country: Uruguay
- Department: Florida Department

Population (2011)
  - Total: 730
- Time zone: UTC -3
- Postal code: 94003
- Dial plan: +598 4339 (+4 digits)

Mendoza, or Mendoza Grande, is a village or populated centre in the Florida Department of southern-central Uruguay.

== Geography ==
It is located on Ruta 5, 4.5 kilometres (2.8 mi) south of Mendoza Chico and 22 kilometres (14 mi) south of Florida. The stream Arroyo Pelado (tributary of Arroyo Mendoza) flows east of the village.

== Population ==
In 2011 Mendoza had a population of 730.

Year	Population
1963	254
1975	323
1985	342
1996	524
2004	745
2011	730

Source: Instituto Nacional de Estadística de Uruguay
