= Bulletin of the Russian Academy of Sciences: Physics =

- Discipline: Physics
- Language: English, Russian
- Edited by: Dmitry Khokhlov

Publication details
- Former name(s): Izvestiya Rossiiskoi Akademii Nauk, Seriya Fizicheskaya
- History: 1936-present
- Publisher: Springer Science+Business Media on behalf of Pleiades Publishing and the Russian Academy of Sciences (Russia)
- Frequency: monthly
- Open access: Hybrid

Standard abbreviations
- ISO 4: Bull. Russ. Acad. Sci.: Phys.

Indexing
- CODEN: BRSPEX
- ISSN: 1062-8738 (print); 1934-9432 (web)
- LCCN: 2006215112

Links
- Journal homepage; Online archive; Russian version; Journal page at Pleiades Publishing

Bulletin of the Russian Academy of Sciences: Physics is a translation of the Russian peer-reviewed scientific journal Известия РАН. Серия физическая (Izvestiya Rossiiskoi Akademii Nauk, Seriya Fizicheskaya) that was established in 1936 as the Bulletin of the Academy of Sciences of USSR: Physics Series, obtaining its current title in 1992. The journal publishes exclusively the transactions of various Russian Academy of Sciences events in the field of physics in its widest sense. Previous editors-in-chief included Sergey Ivanovich Vavilov, Abram Ioffe, A.A. Lebedev, B.S. Djelepov, A.V. Gaponov-Grekhov, and F.V. Bunkin. The current editor-in-chief is Dmitry R. Khokhlov (Lomonosov Moscow State University). Originally the journal was translated into French, switching to English in 1974. Until 2008 it was published by Allerton Press and since then by Pleiades Publishing in collaboration with Springer Science+Business Media.

== Abstracting and indexing ==
The journal is abstracted and indexed in:

- Astrophysics Data System
- Chemical Abstracts Service
- EBSCO databases
- Ei Compendex
- Inspec
- ProQuest databases
- Scopus
- Zentralblatt Math
