= 2862 Vavilov =

Main-belt asteroid

Discovery
- Discovered by: N. Chernykh
- Discovery site: Crimean Astrophysical Obs.
- Discovery date: 15 May 1977

Designations
- Named after: Nikolai Vavilov and Sergey Ivanovich Vavilov (Russian scientists)
- Alternative designations: 1977 JP · 1931 DY; 1972 VF_{1} · 1978 SV_{2}
- Minor planet category: main-belt · (inner); Flora · background

Orbital characteristics
- Epoch 4 September 2017 (JD 2458000.5)
- Uncertainty parameter 0
- Observation arc: 86.60 yr (31,631 days)
- Aphelion: 2.4532 AU
- Perihelion: 1.9490 AU
- Semi-major axis: 2.2011 AU
- Eccentricity: 0.1145
- Orbital period (sidereal): 3.27 yr (1,193 days)
- Mean anomaly: 194.09°
- Mean motion: 0° 18^{m} 6.48^{s} / day
- Inclination: 3.4849°
- Longitude of ascending node: 225.83°
- Argument of perihelion: 278.04°

Physical characteristics
- Dimensions: 6.031±0.681 km 6.44±0.57 km 7.82 km (calculated); 7.95±1.41 km
- Synodic rotation period: 800 h (Note: Pravec (2006) web: lightcurve plot for (2862) Vavilov with rotation period 800 hours and a brightness amplitude of 0.4 mag. Quality code of 2. Observer's comment: "The apparently continuous decrease over the 8-day interval suggests a period on an order of 800 hours or longer; A>=0.4 mag." Summary figures at LCDB and at Ondrejov Asteroid Photometry Project, see (data sheet))
- Geometric albedo: 0.21±0.12; 0.24 (assumed); 0.323±0.059; 0.4039±0.0762; 0.404±0.076
- Spectral type: S (assumed)
- Absolute magnitude (H): 12.7 · 12.78±0.66 · 12.80 · 13.11

2862 Vavilov, provisional designation 1977 JP, is a stony background asteroid and exceptionally slow rotator from the inner regions of the asteroid belt, approximately 7 kilometers in diameter. It was discovered on 15 May 1977, by Soviet astronomer Nikolai Chernykh at the Crimean Astrophysical Observatory in Nauchnij, on the Crimean peninsula. The asteroid was named after Russian plant geneticist Nikolai Vavilov and his physicist brother Sergey Ivanovich Vavilov.

== Orbit and classification ==
Vavilov is located in the dynamical region of the Flora family (402), a giant asteroid family and the largest family of stony asteroids in the main-belt. However, it is a non-family asteroid of the main belt's background population when applying the hierarchical clustering method to its proper orbital elements.

It orbits the Sun in the inner main-belt at a distance of 1.9–2.5 AU once every 3 years and 3 months (1,193 days). Its orbit has an eccentricity of 0.11 and an inclination of 3° with respect to the ecliptic.

The body's observation arc begins with its first identification as 1931 DY at Lowell Observatory in February 1931, more than 46 years prior to its official discovery observation at Nauchnij.

== Physical characteristics ==
Vavilov is an assumed stony S-type asteroid, which is also the overall spectral type for members of the Flora family.

=== Rotation period ===
In February 2006, a rotational lightcurve of Vavilov was obtained from photometric observations by Petr Pravec at Ondřejov Observatory in the Czech Republic. Lightcurve analysis gave a rotation period of 800 hours with a brightness amplitude of at least 0.4 magnitude (U=2)

With a period above 500 hours, Vavilov is one of only a few dozen slow rotators with such an extreme spin rate currently known to exists.

=== Diameter and albedo ===
According to the surveys carried out by the Japanese Akari satellite and the NEOWISE mission of NASA's Wide-field Infrared Survey Explorer, Vavilov measures between 6.031 and 7.95 kilometers in diameter and its surface has an albedo between 0.21 and 0.404.

The Collaborative Asteroid Lightcurve Link assumes an albedo of 0.24 – derived from 8 Flora, the Flora family's parent body – and calculates a diameter of 7.82 kilometers based on an absolute magnitude of 12.7.

== Naming ==
This minor planet was named in memory of Russian plant geneticist Nikolai Vavilov (1887–1943) and his physicist brother Sergey Ivanovich Vavilov (1891-1951). The official naming citation was published by the Minor Planet Center on 18 September 1986 (M.P.C. 11157). The lunar crater Vavilov was also named in their honor.
