= Virginia Mórtola =

- Born: Virginia Mórtola Méndez; 1 January 1975 (age 51); Montevideo, Uruguay
- Occupations: psychoanalyst, educator, writer, psychologist
- Employer(s): Catholic University of Uruguay; Radio Del Sol, La Diaria
- Parent(s): María Virginia Méndez Ramirez; Ruber Mortola Torres
- Awards: Premio Nacional de Literatura de Uruguay; Premio Legionario del Libro
- Website: https://tuquitiportal.com/sobremi.html

Virginia Mórtola (Montevideo, 1975) is a Uruguayan psychologist, psychoanalyst, educator, and writer.

The daughter of María Virginia Méndez Ramón and Ruber Mórtola Torres, she has three sisters. She studied psychology at the Faculty of Psychology of the University of the Republic (Universidad de la República) and earned a master’s degree from the Autonomous University of Barcelona (Universidad Autónoma de Barcelona) in 2018. She received training as a workshop facilitator at Taller Malvín. She is the creator of Tuqui, a portal dedicated to children’s and young adult literature.

She published a series of four informational books on digital citizenship for Ceibal, together with Laura Carrasco and Carla Mórtola.

In 2018, she was awarded the Ópera Prima Prize for the novel La ventana de papel. In 2022, she received the National Literature Prize in the Children’s and Young Adult category for the book Jardín ambulante.

He was a five-time finalist for the Bartolomé Hidalgo Award, presented by the Uruguayan Book Chamber.

She is in a relationship with photographer Federico Ruiz Santesteban and is the mother of Luciana Gulla, lives in El Pinar.

== Books ==
- 2018, La ventana de papel ISBN 978-9974-49-922-5
- 2019, Cuentos de disparate y terror ISBN 978-9974-49-960-7
- 2019, ¡Sim sala bim! Tres palabras mágicas ISBN 978-9974-8686-6-3
- 2021, Estrafalarius. ISBN 978-9915-659-15-2
- 2021, Jardín ambulante ISBN 978-9915-9381-3-4
- 2022, Ema y las abejas ISBN 978-1-946071-42-2
- Caos Subacuático ISBN 978-9974-8574-4-5
- 2023, Ni Dios sabia. ISBN 978-9915-672-14-4
- 2024, Un mar de preguntas ISBN 978-1-946071-44-6
- 2025, Paso a Paso ISBN 978-9915-700-21-2 con Angelina Montero
- 2026, Animales bien contados ISBN 978-9915-713-04-5 con Angelina Montero

== Awards ==
- 2017, Honorable Mention for an unpublished work for Cuentos de disparate y terror.
- 2019, Opera Prima Award in the children’s literature category.
- 2021, Uruguayan National Literature Award in the children’s literature category for Jardín ambulante.
- 2023, Legionario del Libro Award.
- 2024, Uruguayan National Literature Award in the narrative category for Ni Dios sabía.
