= Nikolai Vavilov =

Russian botanist and geneticist (1887–1943)

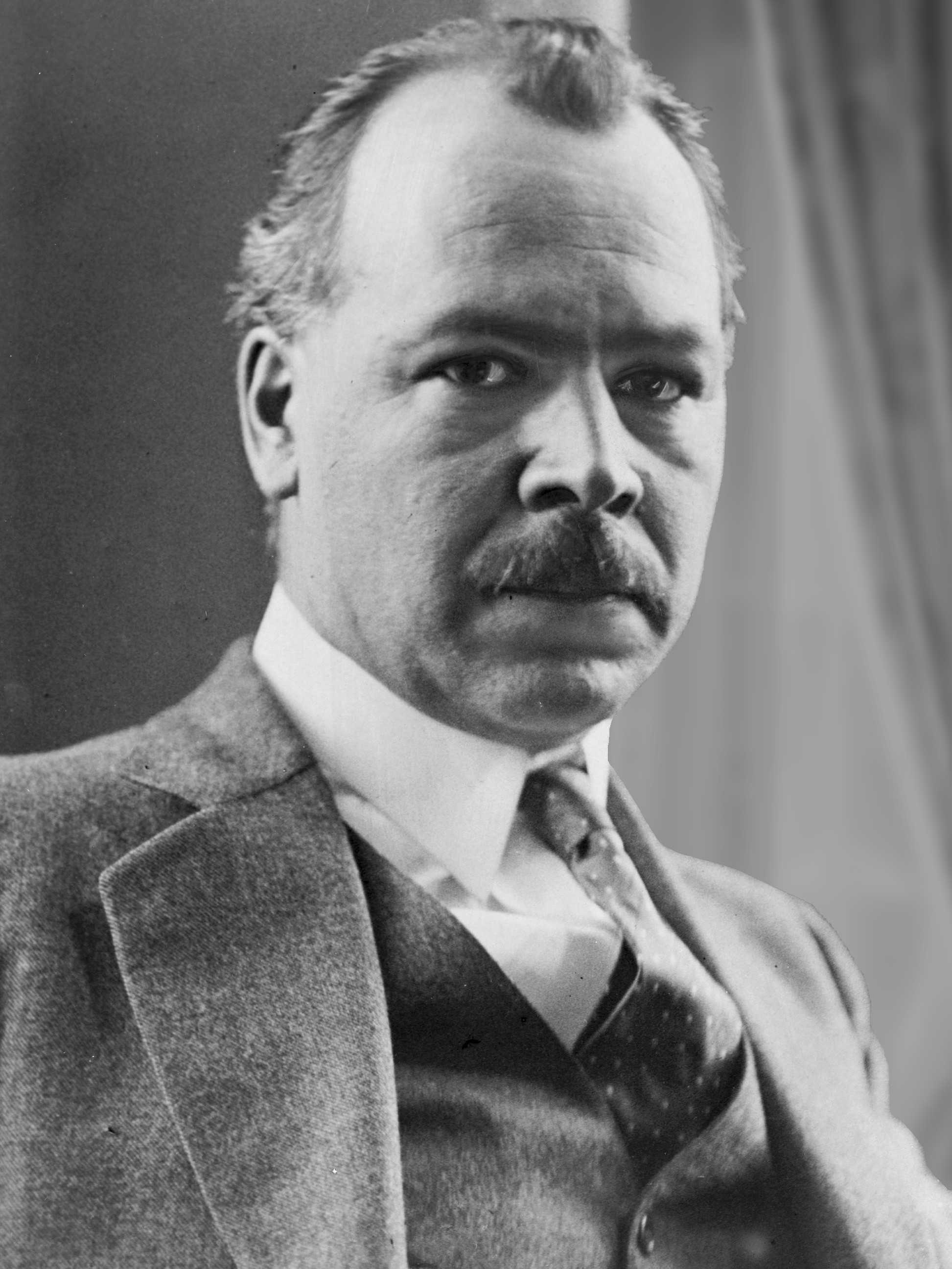
- Vavilov in 1933
- Born: Nikolai Ivanovich Vavilov; 25 November 1887; Moscow, Russian Empire
- Died: 26 January 1943 (aged 55); Saratov, Russian SFSR, Soviet Union
- Education: Moscow Agricultural Institute
- Known for: Centers of origin
- Relatives: Sergey Vavilov (brother)
- Awards: Lenin Prize
- Scientific career
- Fields: Agronomy; Botany; Genetics
- Workplaces: Saratov Agricultural Institute; Lenin All-Union Academy of Agricultural Sciences
- Author abbrev. (botany): Vavilov

Nikolai Ivanovich Vavilov ForMemRS, HFRSE (Russian: Никола́й Ива́нович Вави́лов, IPA: [nʲɪkɐˈlaj ɪˈvanəvʲɪtɕ vɐˈvʲiləf]; 25 November [O.S. 13 November] 1887 – 26 January 1943) was a Russian and Soviet agronomist, botanist and geneticist who identified the centers of origin of cultivated plants. His research focused on improvement of wheat, maize and other cereal crops.

Vavilov became the youngest member of the Academy of Sciences of the Soviet Union. He was a member of the USSR Central Executive Committee, a recipient of the Lenin Prize, and president of All-Union Geographical Society. He was a fellow of the Royal Society and of the Royal Society of Edinburgh.

Vavilov's work was criticized by Trofim Lysenko, whose anti-Mendelian concepts of plant biology had won favor with Joseph Stalin. As a result, Vavilov was arrested and subsequently sentenced to death in July 1941. Although his sentence was commuted to twenty years' imprisonment, he died in prison in 1943. In 1955, his death sentence was retroactively pardoned under Nikita Khrushchev. By the late 1950s, his reputation was publicly rehabilitated, and he began to be hailed as a hero of Soviet science.

== Early years and education ==
Nikolai Vavilov was born on 25 November 1887 into a merchant family in Moscow, the older brother of physicist Sergey Ivanovich Vavilov. Despite his strict upbringing in the Orthodox Church, he was an atheist.

His father had grown up in poverty due to recurring crop failures and food rationing, and Vavilov became obsessed from an early age with ending famine.

Vavilov entered the Petrovskaya Agricultural Academy (now the Russian State Agrarian University – Moscow Timiryazev Agricultural Academy) in 1906. During this time, he became known for carrying a pet lizard in his pocket wherever he went. He graduated from the Petrovka in 1910 with a dissertation on snails as pests. From 1911 to 1912, he worked at the Bureau for Applied Botany and at the Bureau of Mycology and Phytopathology. From 1913 to 1914, he travelled in Europe and studied plant immunity, in collaboration with the British biologist William Bateson, who helped establish the science of genetics.

== Academic career ==
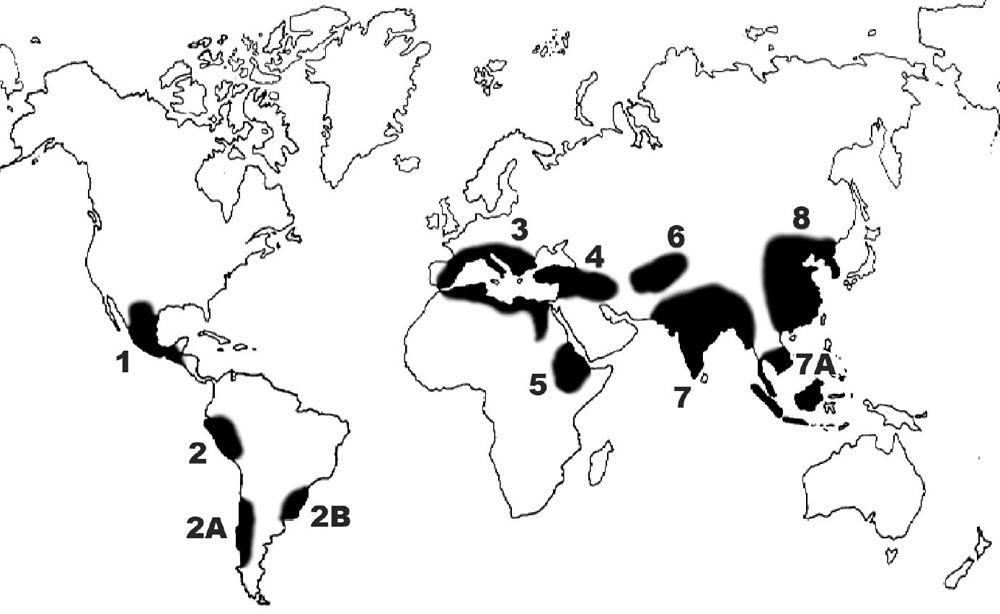
Vavilov's 1924 scheme of centers of origin suggested that plants were domesticated in China, Hindustan, Central Asia, Asia Minor, Mediterranean, Abyssinia, Central and South America.

Throughout his career, Vavilov went on a series of botanical-agronomic expeditions, collecting seeds from many parts of the world, and developing theories of their origins. The first expedition, in 1916, was to Iran, where he collected 171 samples of legume crop seeds new to Russia, including beans, chickpeas, clovers, everlasting peas, lentils, and peas. These finds suggested to him that many cultivated plants including legumes came from a centers of origin in Southwest Asia. In 1917, Vavilov was a professor at the Faculty of Agronomy, University of Saratov. In 1920, he became Director of the Bureau of Applied Botany in Leningrad. Later expeditions visited places including the high plains of Central Asia, Afghanistan, the Khoresm oasis, Japan, and Taiwan. The 1921 expedition visited Canada and the United States; Vavilov stated that North America was not a center of plant diversity, finding later that the centers of origin in the Americas were in Mexico, Central America, and parts of South America. On his way back from America he visited Western Europe, collecting seeds in Britain, France, Holland, Germany, Poland, and Sweden in 1922.

From 1924 to 1935, he was the director of the Lenin All-Union Academy of Agricultural Sciences at Leningrad. He travelled the Mediterranean in 1926, visiting France, Greece, Spain, Portugal, North Africa and islands including Sardinia, Sicily, Crete, and Cyprus. He took special interest in legumes such as the chickpea, which he found contributed to soil fertility and added protein to the diets of people and their animals around the Mediterranean. Another expedition visited Jordan, Palestine, and Syria; he returned with seeds of a white lupin from Palestine; they became useful in plant breeding as they came to maturity early. Later expeditions went to Sudan and Ethiopia, where he identified a center of diversity in 1926.

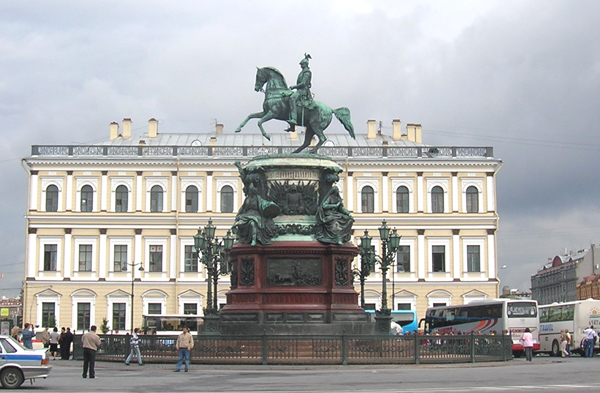
Vavilov created the world's first seed bank in the Institute of Plant Industry, Leningrad.

In 1927, Vavilov presented his theory of centers of origin to the public at the Fifth International Congress of Genetics in Berlin. In his institute at Leningrad, he created the world's largest collection of plant seeds; by 1933, it contained over 148,000 specimens. The collection became internationally famous, attracting praise from overseas but hostile attention from Joseph Stalin.

In 1929 he went to China, Japan, and Korea, locating another center of cultivated plants in Japan.

In 1932, on his last expedition, he travelled widely in Latin America, visiting Cuba, Mexico, Ecuador, Peru, Bolivia, Chile, Brazil, Argentina and Uruguay after attending the Sixth International Congress of Genetics in Uruguay.

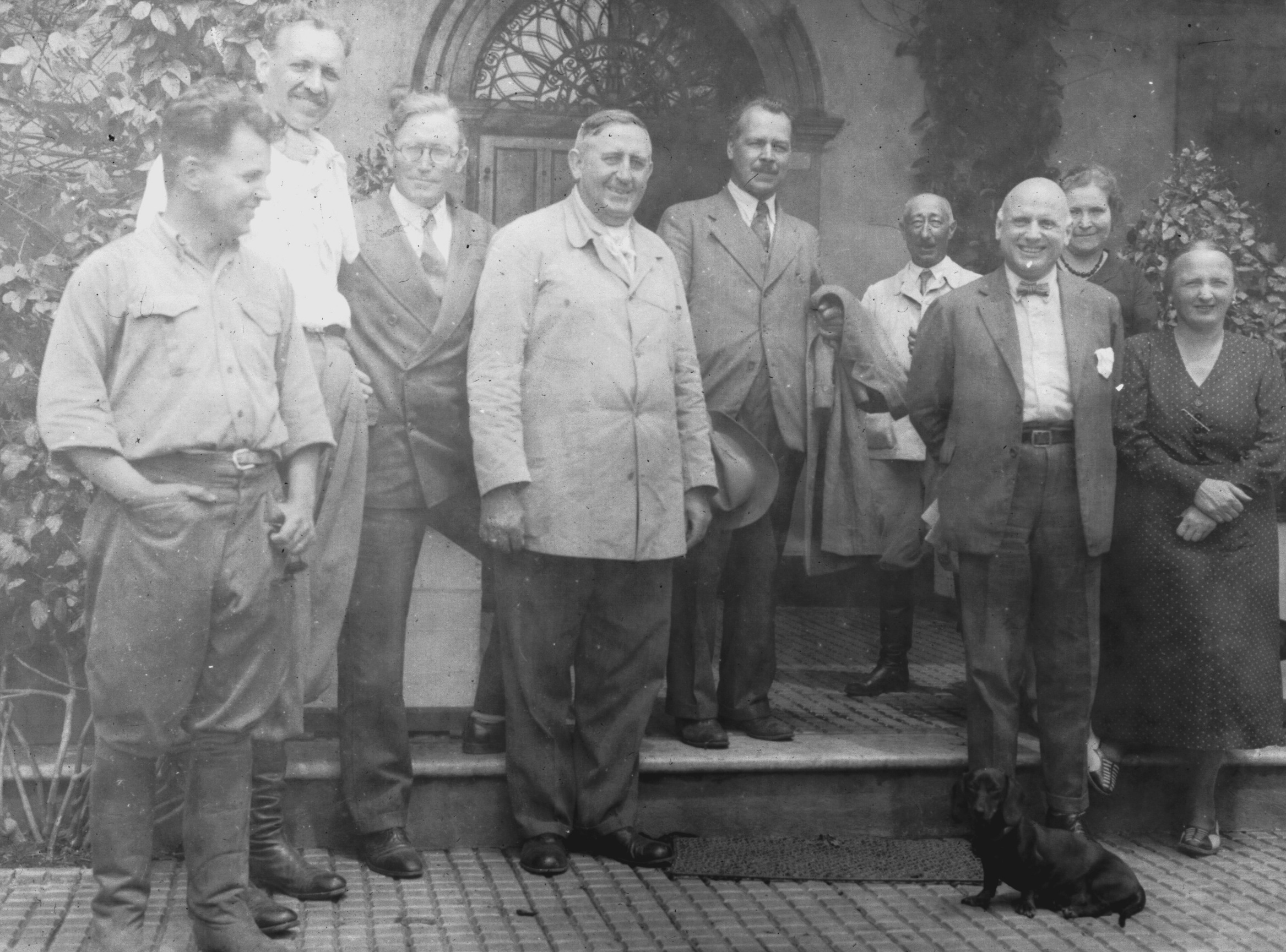
Vavilov (fifth from left) alongside geneticist Albert Boerger during his visit to Uruguay in 1932

Vavilov's work on the genetic diversity of crop plants across the world spanned the concept of centers of origin, the Darwinian problem of speciation, plant breeding, and a geographical approach to studies of crops, as well as the law of homologous series in variation. He is remembered for his contributions to the improvement of varieties of wheat, maize and other cereal crops that sustain the global population. Vavilov was a man of enormous energy, described as having "a mind that never slept and a body which for its capacity for enduring physical hardships can seldom have been matched." For example, he documented 3,000 types of Triticum vulgare wheat, calling them all "perfectly recognizable morphologically"; J. Scott McElroy comments that it is difficult to imagine the time, energy, and knowledge required to collect and describe so many types of one species.

== Eclipse ==
=== Genetics conference debacle ===
In 1932, during the sixth congress, Vavilov proposed holding the seventh International Congress of Genetics in the USSR in 1937. In 1935, Vavilov was elected chairman of the International Congress of Genetics for this purpose, but in 1936 the Politburo cancelled the event; the congress eventually took place in Edinburgh in 1939 instead. The Politburo further prohibited Vavilov from travelling abroad; during the Congress's opening ceremony an empty chair was placed on the stage as a symbolic reminder of Vavilov's involuntary absence.

=== Lysenko's opposition ===
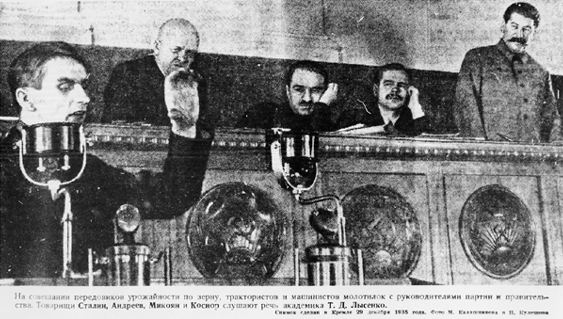
Lysenko speaking at the Kremlin in 1935. Behind him on the far right is Joseph Stalin.

Trofim Lysenko joined the staff of the institute and began to oppose Vavilov, arguing that genetics was nonsense invented by the Roman Catholic monk Gregor Mendel, and proposing his own Lamarckian views of inheritance and evolution, and the idea of improving a crop variety by vernalization. Lysenko had the ear of Stalin, who summoned Vavilov and mocked him in the Kremlin. In 1936, Lysenko arranged for Vavilov to be sacked from his post as head of the institute.

=== Imprisonment and death ===
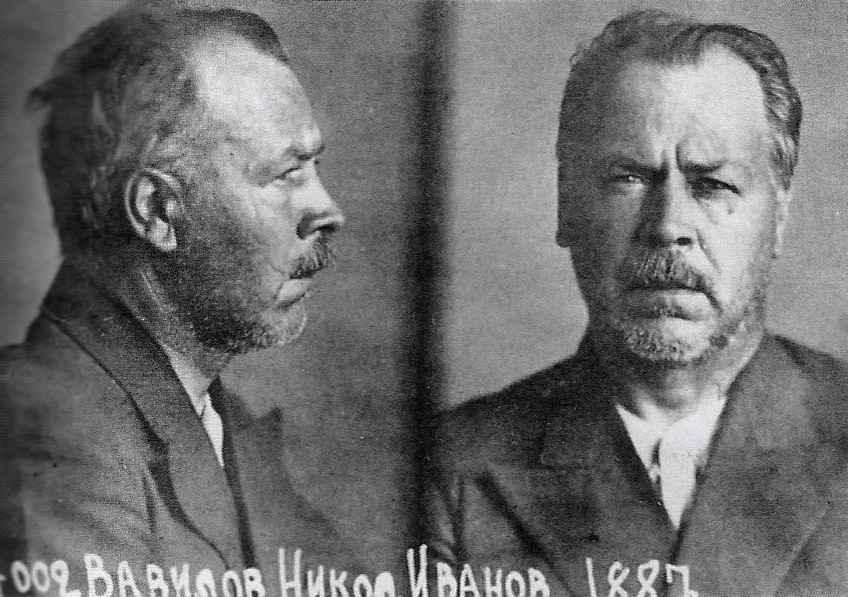
Vavilov's mugshot, 1942

While collecting seeds in Ukraine in August 1940, Vavilov was arrested by the NKVD (the Soviet secret police) and imprisoned for his opposition to Lysenko; he was accused of spying for the British and ruining Soviet agriculture. After undergoing interrogations, he made a false confession, was found guilty, and sentenced to death in 1941. In 1942, his sentence was commuted to twenty years imprisonment. Despite international appeals to free Vavilov, including from the British Prime Minister Winston Churchill, in 1943, he died in prison in Saratov as a result of the harsh conditions. The prison's medical documentation indicates that he had been admitted into the prison hospital a few days prior to his death and mentions the diagnoses of pneumonia, dystrophy and edema as well as general weakness as a complaint, but the death certificate only mentions "decline of cardiac activity". Some authors assert that the actual cause of death was starvation.

== Personal life ==
Vavilov's son Oleg with his first wife Yekaterina Sakharova was born in 1918. That marriage ended in divorce in 1926, after which he married geneticist Elena Ivanovna Barulina, a specialist on lentils and assistant head of the institute's seed collection. Their son Yuri was born in 1928.

== Honors and distinctions ==
Vavilov became the youngest member of the Academy of Sciences of the Soviet Union. He was a member of the USSR Central Executive Committee, a recipient of the Lenin Prize in 1928, and president of All-Union Geographical Society in 1931. He was a fellow of the Royal Society (of London), and a fellow of the Royal Society of Edinburgh.

== Legacy ==
=== Seedbank ===
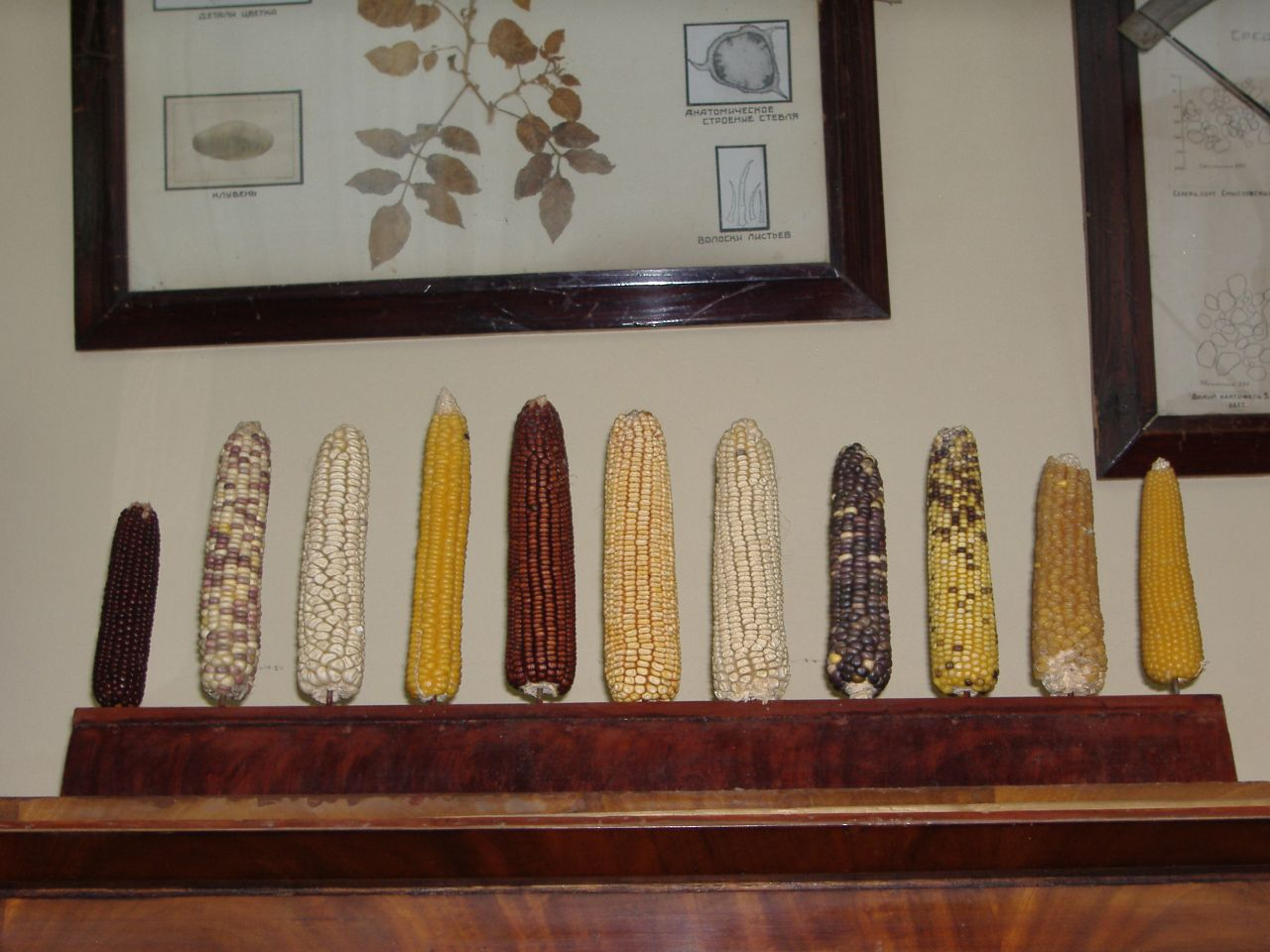
Maize diversity in Vavilov's office

Vavilov realized that many useful plant varieties would be lost through human action unless specific steps were taken to save them. He was the first botanist to grasp the need for a seedbank, and he was an expert germplasm collector. The Leningrad seedbank was preserved and protected through the 28-month long Siege of Leningrad. While the Soviets had ordered the evacuation of art from the Hermitage Museum, they had not evacuated the 250,000 samples of seeds, roots, and fruits stored in what was then the world's largest seedbank. A group of scientists at the Vavilov Institute boxed up a cross section of seeds, moved them to the basement, and took shifts protecting them. Those guarding the seedbank refused to eat its contents, even though by the end of the siege in the spring of 1944, a number of them had died of starvation.

In 1943, parts of Vavilov's collection, samples stored within the territories occupied by the German armies, mainly in Ukraine and Crimea, were seized by a German unit headed by Heinz Brücher. Many of the samples were transferred to the Schutzstaffel (SS) Institute for Plant Genetics, which had been established at Schloss Lannach near Graz, Austria.

=== Economic impact ===
Vavilov combined the skill of collecting distinct varieties of crop plants with theoretical understanding of their significance in botany and the ability to put this knowledge to practical use. In particular, he created the collection of germplasm of leguminous crop plants held at the Vavilov Institute of Plant Industry (renamed after him in 1967). In turn, this collection supplied the germplasm for more than three quarters of the legume varieties bred in the Soviet Union. By 2010, the institute held 43,000 legume samples, from 160 species in 15 genera. Vavilov's work has been continued by later botanists at the institute, for example breeding transgressive forms of lupin (a legume) resistant to the fusarium wilt fungus.

=== Soviet rehabilitation ===
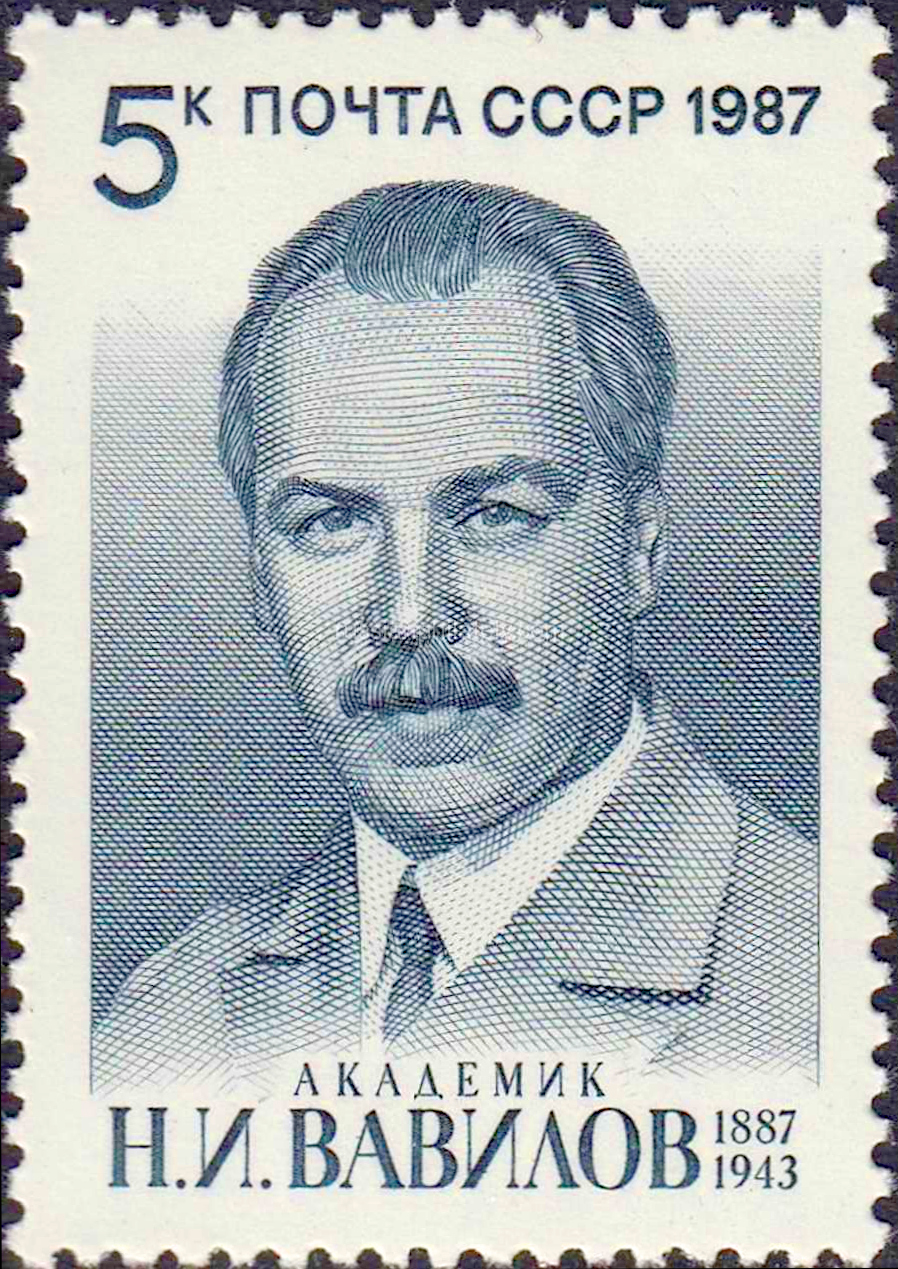
Vavilov on a 1987 Soviet stamp

In 1955, Vavilov's life sentence was voided at a hearing of the Military Collegium of the Supreme Court of the Soviet Union, undertaken as part of a de-Stalinization effort to review Stalin-era death sentences in the time of Nikita Khrushchev. By the late 1950s, his reputation was publicly rehabilitated, and he began to be hailed as a hero of Soviet science.

=== Vavilovian mimicry ===
While studying the origins and evolutionary history of crop plants including cereals, Vavilov observed that weeds are inevitably included with crop seed by seed contamination. A consequence, he stated, was that the weed would evolve to appear progressively more like the crop: whenever a farmer, or a winnowing machine, removed as many weed seeds as possible, only the weed seeds that most closely resembled the crop would survive. Thus, selection would be applied unconsciously by the farmer (or by the winnowing machine used to separate the seeds). Vavilov described the cereal rye, which he believed had evolved in this way, as secondary crops. In 1982, Georges Pasteur proposed the name 'Vavilovian mimicry' for this process.

=== Commemoration ===
Today, a street in downtown Saratov bears Vavilov's name. Vavilov's monument in Saratov near the end of Vavilov Street was unveiled in 1997. The USSR Academy of Sciences established the Vavilov Award (1965) and the Vavilov Medal (1968). Today, the N.I. Vavilov Institute of Plant Industry in St. Petersburg still maintains one of the world's largest collections of plant genetic material. In 1968, the institute was renamed after Vavilov in time for its 75th anniversary. A minor planet, 2862 Vavilov, discovered in 1977 by Soviet astronomer Nikolai Stepanovich Chernykh is named after him and his brother Sergey Ivanovich Vavilov. The crater Vavilov on the far side of the Moon is named after him and his brother, a physicist.

=== Media ===
The story of the researchers at the Vavilov Institute during the Siege of Leningrad was fictionalized by novelist Elise Blackwell in her 2003 novel Hunger. That novel was the inspiration for the Decemberists' song "When The War Came" in the 2006 album The Crane Wife, which also depicts the Institute during the siege and mentions Vavilov by name.

In 1987, the Shevchenko National Prize was awarded to Anatoliy Borsyuk (film director), Serhiy Dyachenko (script writer), and Oleksandr Frolov (camera) for the film Star of Vavilov (Russian: "Звезда Вавилова") about Vavilov's work.

In 1990, a six-part feature film (TV series) entitled Nikolai Vavilov (Russian: Николай Вавилов) was created as a joint production of the USSR and East Germany.

== Books ==
=== In Russian ===
- Земледельческий Афганистан. (1929) (Agricultural Afghanistan)
- Селекция как наука. (1934) (Breeding as science)
- Закон гомологических рядов в наследственной изменчивости. (1935) (The law of homology series in genetical mutability)
- Учение о происхождении культурных растений после Дарвина. (1940) (The theory of origins of cultivated plants after Darwin)
- Географическая локализация генов пшениц на земном шаре. (1929) (The Geographical Localization of Wheat Genes on the Earth)

=== In English ===
- The Origin, Variation, Immunity and Breeding of Cultivated Plants (translated by K. Starr Chester). 1951. Chronica Botanica 13:1–366, link
- Origin and Geography of Cultivated Plants (translated by Doris Löve). 1987. Cambridge University Press, Cambridge.
- Five Continents (translated by Doris Löve). 1997. IPGRI, Rome; VIR, St. Petersburg.

== See also ==
- Lysenkoism
- Joseph Meister
- VASKhNIL (the All-Union Academy of Agricultural Sciences of the Soviet Union)
