= Alejandro Gallinal =

Alejandro Gallinal Cerro Colorado
- Village
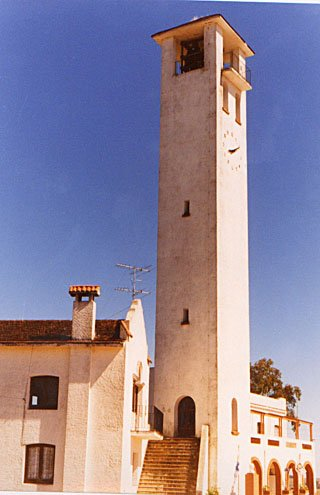
- El Carrillón at Alejandro Gallinal

- Location in Uruguay
- Coordinates: 33°52′0″S 55°33′0″W
- Country: Uruguay
- Department: Florida Department

Population (2011)
  - Total: 1,357
- Time zone: UTC -3
- Postal code: 94101
- Dial plan: +598 4318 (+4 digits)

Alejandro Gallinal or Cerro Colorado (old name, still in use) is a village in the Florida Department of southern-central Uruguay.

== Geography ==
It is located on route 7 of the canal path Route 7, about 142 kilometres (88 mi) northeast of Montevideo.

== History ==
On 18 December 1952, the locality "Cerro Colorado" was given its new name by decree Ley N° 11.893. Its status was elevated to "Pueblo" (village) by decree Ley N° 15.708 on 28 January 1985.

== Population ==
In 2011 Alejandro Gallinal had a population of 1,357.

Year	Population
1963	593
1975	906
1985	1,092
1996	1,170
2004	1,336
2011	1,357

Source: Instituto Nacional de Estadística de Uruguay
