= Veinticinco de Agosto =

Veinticinco de Agosto 25 de Agosto
- Town
- Location in Uruguay
- Coordinates: 34°24′40″S 56°24′21″W
- Country: Uruguay
- Department: Florida Department

Population (2011)
  - Total: 1,849
- Time zone: UTC -3
- Postal code: 94002
- Dial plan: +598 4338 (+4 digits)

Veinticinco de Agosto, mostly written 25 de Agosto, is a small town in the Florida Department of central Uruguay.

== Geography ==
It is located on Route 77, about 7 kilometres (4.3 mi) northeast of its intersection with Route 11. The railroad track from Montevideo splits here in two tracks, one towards Salto and one towards Florida, the capital of the department.

The river Río Santa Lucía flows along the east limits of the village.

== History ==
It was recognized as a recently created populated centre by a decree of 1 September 1875 and on 29 April 1912, it was declared a "Pueblo" (village) by the Act of Ley Nº 3.965. Its status was elevated to "Villa" (town) by the Act of Ley Nº 12.297 on 5 July 1956.

== Population ==
In 2011, Veinticinco de Agosto had a population of 1,849.

Year	Population
1963	1,586
1975	1,750
1985	1,711
1996	1,727
2004	1,794
2011	1,849

Source: Instituto Nacional de Estadística de Uruguay

== Places of worship ==
- Parish Church of the Saints Cosmas and Damian (Roman Catholic)
