= Sergey Vavilov =

Soviet physicist (1891–1951)

- Сергей Вавилов
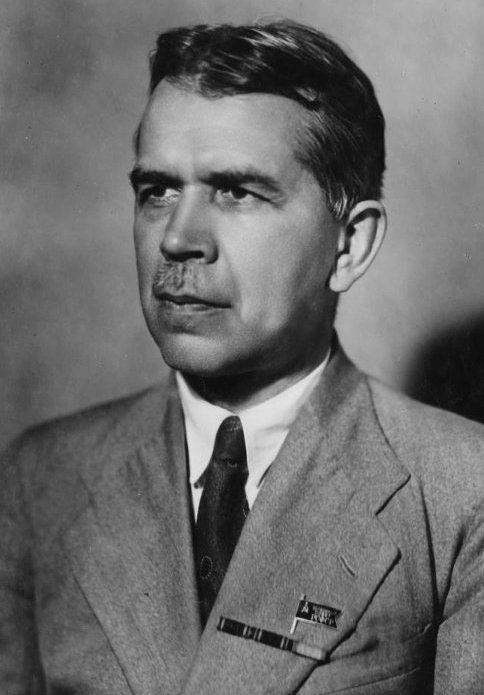
- Vavilov in 1945
- Born: Sergey Ivanovich Vavilov; 24 March 1891; Moscow, Russian Empire
- Died: 25 January 1951 (aged 59); Moscow, Russian SFSR, Soviet Union
- Education: Moscow State University
- Known for: Vavilov-Cherenkov effect
- Scientific career
- Fields: Physics, optics
- Doctoral advisor: Pyotr Lebedev
- Doctoral students: Pavel Cherenkov; Ilya Frank; Vladimir Veksler

Sergey Ivanovich Vavilov (Russian: Серге́й Ива́нович Вави́лов [sʲɪrˈɡʲej ɪˈvanəvʲɪtɕ vɐˈvʲiləf]; 24 March [O.S. 12 March] 1891 – January 25, 1951) was a Soviet physicist, the president of the Academy of Sciences of the Soviet Union from July 1945 until his death. His elder brother Nikolai Vavilov was a famous Russian geneticist.

== Biography ==
Vavilov founded the Soviet school of physical optics, known by his works in luminescence. In 1934 he co-discovered the Vavilov-Cherenkov effect, a discovery for which Pavel Cherenkov was awarded a Nobel Prize in Physics in 1958. The Kasha–Vavilov rule of luminescence quantum yields is also named for him.

He was a member of the USSR Academy of Sciences from 1932, Head of the Lebedev Institute of Physics (since 1934), a chief editor of the Great Soviet Encyclopedia, a member of the Supreme Soviet from 1946 and a recipient of two Stalin Prizes second degree (1943, 1951 — posthumously) and two Stalin Prizes first degree (1946, 1952 – posthumously).

He wrote on the lives and works of great thinkers, such as Lucretius, Galileo Galilei, Isaac Newton, Mikhail Lomonosov, Michael Faraday, and Pyotr Lebedev, among others.

At the end of 1950, Vavilov's health deteriorated significantly. He had been suffering from heart and lung diseases. In December-January he was treated at the Barvikha Sanatorium. Returning from the sanatorium on January 12, 1951, he chaired an expanded meeting of the Presidium of the Academy of Sciences. On January 25, 1951, at 4:45 a.m., he died of a myocardial infarction.

== Legacy ==
A meteorological station (as well as a glacier and an ice cap) in October Revolution Island, in the Severnaya Zemlya group have been named after Vavilov. A minor planet 2862 Vavilov discovered in 1977 by Soviet astronomer Nikolai Chernykh is named after him and his brother Nikolai Vavilov. The crater Vavilov on the far side of the Moon is also named after him and his brother.

There is a ship named after him, the Akademik Sergey Vavilov. She is a research vessel that can carry approximately 150 crew and passengers, and is a Class-1A icebreaker which regularly makes trips to Antarctica and the Arctic. In the summer of 2010 she was working in and around the coast of Svalbard. Also, an Aeroflot plane, with VO-BHL identification number is named after him.

Academic offices
Preceded by Vladimir Komarov	President of the Academy of Sciences of the USSR; 1945–1951	Succeeded by Alexander Nesmeyanov
