= Ceibal project =

Educational technology initiative in Uruguay

Ceibal
- Formation: 2007; 19 years ago
- Type: Education
- Headquarters: Uruguay; Avenida Italia 6201, Carrasco, Montevideo, Uruguay
- Official language: Spanish
- Director: Leandro Folgar
- Website: https://www.ceibal.edu.uy/es

The Ceibal project is a Uruguayan initiative to implement the "One Laptop per Child" model to introduce Information and Communication Technologies (ICT) in primary education and secondary schools.

In four years, Ceibal delivered 450,000 laptops to all students and teachers in the primary education system and no-cost internet access throughout the country. As of 2009, results included increased self-esteem in students, improved motivation of students and teachers, and active participation by parents (94% approved of the plan, according to a national survey performed in 2009).

The success of Ceibal is not only due to technological innovations, but also to achievements such as the creation of a training plan for teachers in primary education, the active inclusion of the society and teachers in the project and the successful design and implementation of a monitoring and evaluation model to measure the impact nationally that serves as a guide to define future actions in the plan.

Ceibal emerged as a result of the digital gap that existed in Uruguay between the people who didn't have access to technology and to those who did. It was impelled during Tabaré Vazquez' term of office. Vasquez was the main proponent of this pioneer project; although it was inspired by Nicholas Negroponte's One Laptop per Child project. It raised three principal values: to distribute technology, to promote knowledge and to generate social equity.

The project was named "Ceibal" in reference to a typical Uruguayan tree and flower called "ceibo", known as Cockspur coral tree. Ceibal also stands for "Conectividad Educativa de Informática Básica para el Aprendizaje en Línea" (Educational Connectivity/Basic Computing for Online Learning). The OLPC XO-1 computers used in the project are nicknamed "Ceibalitas".

== Goals ==
Ceibal tries to promote digital inclusion and decrease the digital gap that exists among the Uruguayans and between Uruguay and the rest of the world. However, this goal can be accomplished only if it is complemented by an educational plan for teachers, students and their families. The educational plan of Ceibal tries to create the technological resources, the teacher's formation, the creation of suitable content and the social and familiar participation.

Ceibal has strategic principles: equity of knowledge, equal opportunities for children and youth, and the provision of tools to learn not only knowledge given by the school, but also knowledge that the child can learn alone. The original expected outcomes defined the right to have an internet connection at school as well as at home.

=== General ===
- To improve the quality of education through the new technological system.
- Providing computers to every scholar and teacher of the public education, promote the same opportunities for all.
- To develop a culture based on collaboration between children, a child and teacher, teachers with each other, families and school.
- To promote a sense of criticism of technology on the pedagogical community.
- To provide an internet connection at home as well as at school to all students.

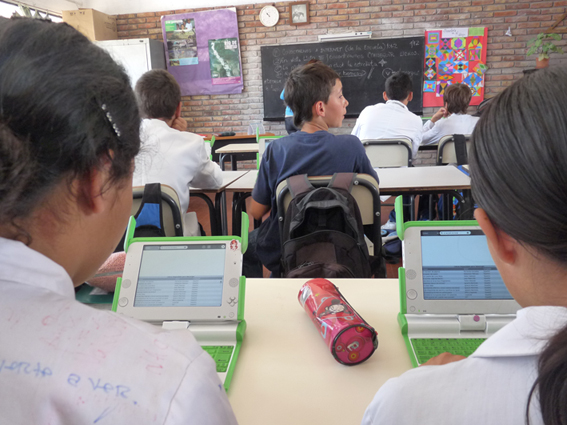
Students with XO laptops

=== Specific ===
- To promote the laptops as a useful tool in the schools.
- To offer the teachers a suitable technological and pedagogical formation of the new technologies.
- To produce educational resources, with the new technological tools.
- To inspire an innovational mind of the teachers.
- To assure a good development of the project by a supportive system and technological assistance.
- To involve the parents in the implementation of the project, not only in the schools but also in the houses of the scholars.
- To promote the proportion of relevant information of all the people involved in the project, in order to improve it.

== Phases ==
- To assure a good development of the project by a supportive system and technological assistance.
- To involve the parents in the implementation of the project, not only in the schools but also in the houses of the scholars.
- To promote the proportion of relevant information of all the people involved in the project, in order to improve it.

== Stages ==
2007

In April, the presidential decree 144/007 signaled the kickoff to provide a laptop to each primary school child and their teacher in every public school, as well as training for its use, and the promotion of educational proposals.

In May. the pilot phase started in Villa Cardal (Departamento de Florida), in which 150 students and their teachers participated. Villa Cardal is a town of 1,290 inhabitants and has just one school of 150 students. For this pilot phase, laptops were donated by OLPC.

In October, through an open tender, 100,000 OLPC laptops and 200 servers were awarded.

By the end of 2007, all children and teachers from Florida had their laptops.

2008

Before the end of the year, more than 175,000 laptops were delivered, completing the whole country, with the exception of parts of Canelones, Montevideo and its metropolitan area.

In September, Ceibal and Teleton Uruguay signed an agreement that committed Ceibal to adapt its laptops to the needs of children with motor disabilities.

In December, the educational portal Ceibal was created.

2009

In April, work started with small companies in the interior of the country to provide decentralized technical support, within the framework of the Rayuela Project with the Inter-American Development Bank and DINAPYME.

In June, online courses aimed at students in teacher education were launched in support of the National Administration of Public Education (ANEP). In the same month, the first national monitoring and evaluation system was developed to work within Ceibal.

In August, laptops are delivered to private schools In the same month, laptops for the visually imparted were delivered.

In October, the plan is fully covered, including Canelones, Montevideo and its metropolitan area. All children and teachers in the country had their own laptops, with a coverage of more than 350,000 children and 16,000 teachers.

2010

In May, private companies sponsored Ceibal classrooms in their companies as part of their social responsibility projects.

In November, the pilot project in robotics was launched.

In October, Ceibal started its second phase, delivering laptops to students in secondary schools and to students in technical schools.

2011

In March, the Ceibal project started a new and ambitious phase introducing laptops in nursery schools.

In August, a television show called ¡Sabelo! (Know it!) started. It is a quiz show produced by Ceibal for students in secondary schools.

2012

To celebrate the fifth anniversary of Ceibal, a ceremony took place at Villa Cardal, where it all started.

2013

On 2 October, President José Mujica delivered the 1,000,000th computer into an act at Escuela N° 177 (Yugoslavia 307) from Nuevo París, in Montevideo.

== Awards ==
In recognition of the Ceibal project's achievements, it has received various national and international awards:

- Bronze Medal for National Quality and Commitment in Public Management due to Ceibal Project's work in connectivity and connectivity support, National Institute of Quality INACAL, Uruguay, October 2012
- Frida Award in the category "Access", awarded by LANIC, IDRC and ISCO, Buenos Aires, Argentina, October 2011
- First Prize in Development Capacity, awarded by UNDP-United Nations Development Programme for Development at the "Knowledge Fair", Marrakech, Morocco, March 2010
- Prize for Public Management, awarded by RED GEALC-Network of e-government Leaders of Latin America and the Caribbean "ExcelGob08", Montevideo, Uruguay, March 2009
- Special Mention for Ceibal's Commitment with the Millennium Goals, awarded by RED GEALC-Network of e-government Leaders of Latin America and the Caribbean "ExcelGob08", Montevideo, Uruguay, March 2009
- Morosoli Golden Prize to Uruguayan Culture awarded by the Lolita Rubial Foundation, Minas, Uruguay, December 2013

== English project ==
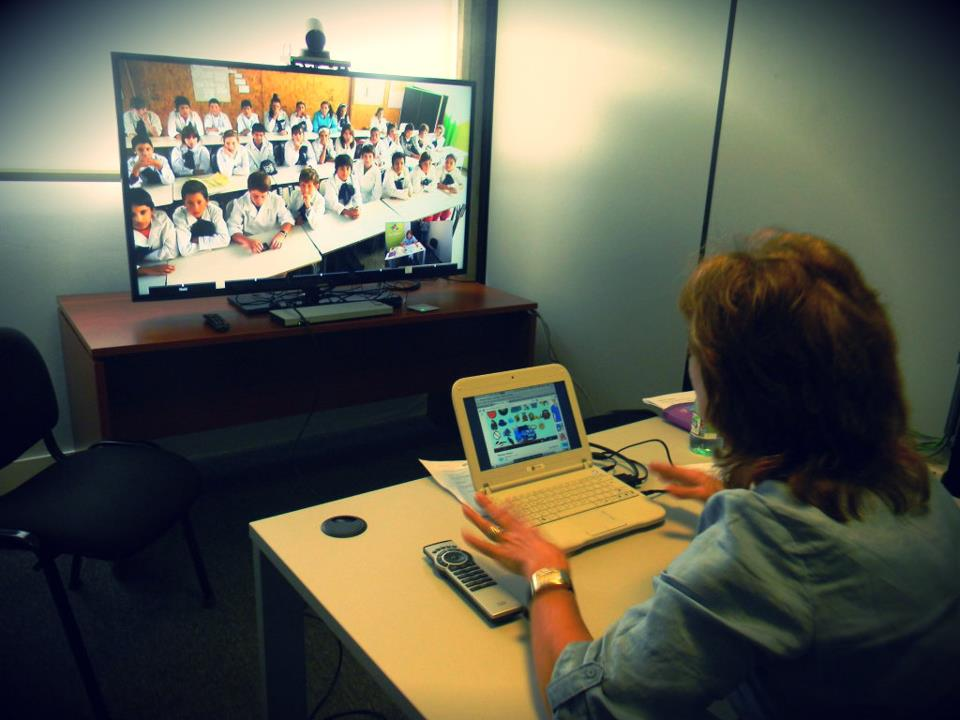
Primera clase de Ceibal en Inglés

The project Ceibal en Inglés was conceived to address the lack of specialized teachers of English in primary schools in the Uruguayan public system of education, with the objective of universalizing the right of every Uruguayan child to acquire a second language through a means that would ensure both quality and sustainability.

=== Design ===
The project allows primary school children between fourth and sixth grades to have three 45 minute slots per week of English: one taught by a remote teacher, model of language and in charge of introducing and explaining the linguistic content corresponding to each week through his remote presence via videoconference equipment; and two forty-five-minute slots with the classroom teacher, who following the lesson plans sent to her every week, may review, accompany and guide her students in the learning of English. Lesson plans are associated to digital and non-digital materials, which contain songs, games, videos, etc., so that those contents already presented and explained by the remote teacher, may be revised, reviewed and recycled under the conduction of the classroom teacher. Coherence between remote lessons and face to face lessons is ensured by a half-hour virtual coordination between the two teachers involved in the learning process, in which concerns, learning and teaching styles are discussed.

Each classroom teacher decides whether she wants to participate in this project, she does not need to know any English, but she receives an online course of English so that she can be one step ahead of her students and give them the necessary support.

=== Pilot phase and expansion ===
This project was piloted in twenty schools in the country between June and November 2012; five in the south (three in Maldonado and two in Pando, Canelones), and fifteen in the north between Salto and Paysandú, with a total of 37 groups. The group in the south started on 23 June, and the one in the north on 23 August.

The results of the pilot phase are highly encouraging, for this reason, Ceibal en Inglés has expanded the project to one thousand groups in 2013. Ceibal through an open international bid chose the British Council, a British organization of recorded experience in the teaching of English as a foreign language internationally, as its partner for this project.

On 9 January 2014, the BBC Mundo website published the article "Thousands of children in Uruguay learn English with distance teachers". The report highlights the work done by Ceibal and explains that "this is the first time in the world where telepresence technology is used to teach English to large classes of primary school students in the state system", according to Paul Woods, representative of the British Council, the organization providing the teaching materials.

== Computing device models ==
As of 2020, the computers that are part of this program keep being improved and changed (the models described on this list do not include much in the way of official names due to lack of documentation).

=== On-launch Ceibalita ===
Also called "Marcianita", this version was very limited, with a very slow processor and a total of 300 MB of RAM. The storage was around 1-2 GBs. It was mostly white with green details.

==== Hardware ====
This model was white with a logo on the lid composed of a circle on top of an X, both encrusted on the lid and being of random colors.

It had a green membrane keyboard that was similar to any other laptop keyboard, with the exception of having all the F1 through F12 keys replaced with symbols that indicated their new functions as well as some other minor changes.

It had a simple mouse pad with two buttons, one with an X and one with an O as symbols. Uunlike most modern mousepads, it did not accept more than one input at once, and could not perform gestures like tap-and-hold or double finger swiping.

It had two sets of four buttons at each side of the screen, with the left one being a single piece d-pad and the other side having four buttons, with the symbols X, O, a checkmark symbol and a triangle. These were apparently made for playing games, but were fairly unwieldy due to the screen's width and weight.

It had two speakers, both at the sides of the screen and above each set of buttons, the microphone was located right below the screen, the earphone jack was located at the right border of the case, on the screen's side.

The top left and right of the screen had two green antennas that when withdrawn fitted perfectly with the rest of the case. These antennas concealed a pair of USB ports. The computer could not be closed without hiding the antennas first.

=== Software ===
The laptop ran sugar, an open source OS based on Linux, which was fairly limited, the programs were called activities, only allowing one to run at the same time.

The computer had four sections which were accessed with F1, F2, F3 and F4. These keys had different logos to match all being represented with a black circle and green shapes. F1 (community view) had six green dots near the border, F2 (group view) had three green dots near the center, F3 ?, F4 had a simple green rectangle.

First it had community view, which displayed other laptops of the same kind in the local network represented by the same logo on the lid of the computer, this screen allowed to form groups and perform other cooperative activities, especially inviting others to an activity which allowed more than one user, like the text editor.

The group view showed other computers on the same group. This was not so different from the community view other than trimming the amount of computers on-screen.

The "toolbox" (unknown real name) view had all of the installed activities ready to be launched.

The activity view showed the currently launched activity, this did not work if no activity had been launched yet.

Buttons F5 to F8 had just black dots of increasing size, F9 to F12 had buttons to adjust volume and screen brightness.

=== Later models ===
As time went on, more improved versions of the ceibalita were made, this also included their hardware which was severely upgraded to fit the new features.

==== Hardware ====
The keyboard was changed to a green plastic one and the mouse was improved to accept most gestures, eventually dropping the F1–F12 special keys, screen resolution was improved, their processor, storage and RAM also had significant upgrades. Later models changed to a blue motif instead of the old green one.

==== Software ====
Sugar was upgraded to allow for more activities open at once between other features, the computer also came with Android installed and eventually also Linux, which could be switched by restarting, changing to sugar didn't require a restart but took a significant amount of time. Sugar was eventually dropped altogether from the latest models.

=== Tablets ===
Usually targeted towards pre-schoolers, these tablets came with Android and a special educative OS with parental restrictions which required completing a simple mathematical operation to unlock.

=== Conventional laptops ===
Eventually, the original model was discontinued and common laptop models were distributed in its stead, these had a significantly more frail case, but their hardware had significant upgrades from the previous models, with storage being increased to 60 GB and getting 2.4 GHz Dual Core CPUs, these computers ditched Android in favor of Windows 10, but kept Linux.

A series of four informational books on digital citizenship has been published for Ceibal, authored by Laura Carrasco, Carla Mórtola, and Virginia Mórtola.

== See also ==
- One Laptop per Child#Uruguay
