= Slobodka, Russia =

Slobodka (Russian: Слободка) is the name of several rural localities in Russia.

== Modern localities ==
=== Arkhangelsk Oblast ===
As of 2012, three rural localities in Arkhangelsk Oblast bear this name:

- Slobodka, Kholmogorsky District, Arkhangelsk Oblast, a village in Yemetsky Selsoviet of Kholmogorsky District
- Slobodka, Primorsky District, Arkhangelsk Oblast, a village in Lisestrovsky Selsoviet of Primorsky District
- Slobodka, Vilegodsky District, Arkhangelsk Oblast, a village in Vilegodsky Selsoviet of Vilegodsky District

=== Republic of Bashkortostan ===
As of 2012, one rural locality in the Republic of Bashkortostan bears this name:

- Slobodka, Republic of Bashkortostan, a khutor in Skvorchikhinsky Selsoviet of Ishimbaysky District

=== Bryansk Oblast ===
As of 2012, one rural locality in Bryansk Oblast bears this name:

- Slobodka, Bryansk Oblast, a village in Lopandinsky Rural Administrative Okrug of Komarichsky District; 52°31′N 34°50′E

=== Ivanovo Oblast ===
As of 2012, three rural localities in Ivanovo Oblast bear this name:

- Slobodka, Komsomolsky District, Ivanovo Oblast, a village in Komsomolsky District
- Slobodka, Rodnikovsky District, Ivanovo Oblast, a village in Rodnikovsky District
- Slobodka, Shuysky District, Ivanovo Oblast, a village in Shuysky District

=== Kaluga Oblast ===
As of 2012, seven rural localities in Kaluga Oblast bear this name:

- Slobodka, Babyninsky District, Kaluga Oblast, a village in Babyninsky District
- Slobodka, Duminichsky District, Kaluga Oblast, a village in Duminichsky District
- Slobodka, Lyudinovsky District, Kaluga Oblast, a village in Lyudinovsky District
- Slobodka, Meshchovsky District, Kaluga Oblast, a village in Meshchovsky District
- Slobodka, Spas-Demensky District, Kaluga Oblast, a village in Spas-Demensky District
- Slobodka, Tarussky District, Kaluga Oblast, a village in Tarussky District
- Slobodka, Ulyanovsky District, Kaluga Oblast, a village in Ulyanovsky District

=== Kirov Oblast ===
As of 2012, three rural localities in Kirov Oblast bear this name:

- Slobodka, Orlovsky District, Kirov Oblast, a village in Podgorodny Rural Okrug of Orlovsky District
- Slobodka, Denisovsky Rural Okrug, Slobodskoy District, Kirov Oblast, a village in Denisovsky Rural Okrug of Slobodskoy District
- Slobodka, Ilyinsky Rural Okrug, Slobodskoy District, Kirov Oblast, a village in Ilyinsky Rural Okrug of Slobodskoy District

=== Kostroma Oblast ===
As of 2012, three rural localities in Kostroma Oblast bear this name:

- Slobodka, Buysky District, Kostroma Oblast, a village in Tsentralnoye Settlement of Buysky District
- Slobodka, Kostromskoy District, Kostroma Oblast, a village in Baksheyevskoye Settlement of Kostromskoy District
- Slobodka, Sudislavsky District, Kostroma Oblast, a village in Raslovskoye Settlement of Sudislavsky District

=== Krasnodar Krai ===
As of 2012, one rural locality in Krasnodar Krai bears this name:

- Slobodka, Krasnodar Krai, a khutor in Achuyevsky Rural Okrug of Slavyansky District

=== Kursk Oblast ===
As of 2012, two rural localities in Kursk Oblast bear this name:

- Slobodka, Rylsky District, Kursk Oblast, a village in Nekrasovsky Selsoviet of Rylsky District
- Slobodka, Zolotukhinsky District, Kursk Oblast, a village in Vereitinovsky Selsoviet of Zolotukhinsky District

=== Leningrad Oblast ===
As of 2012, two rural localities in Leningrad Oblast bear this name:

- Slobodka, Kingiseppsky District, Leningrad Oblast, a village in Vistinskoye Settlement Municipal Formation of Kingiseppsky District
- Slobodka, Volosovsky District, Leningrad Oblast, a village in Seltsovskoye Settlement Municipal Formation of Volosovsky District

=== Lipetsk Oblast ===
As of 2012, five rural localities in Lipetsk Oblast bear this name:

- Slobodka, Dankovsky District, Lipetsk Oblast, a village in Voskresensky Selsoviet of Dankovsky District
- Slobodka, Lebedyansky District, Lipetsk Oblast, a selo in Slobodskoy Selsoviet of Lebedyansky District
- Slobodka, Lipetsky District, Lipetsk Oblast, a village in Ivovsky Selsoviet of Lipetsky District
- Slobodka, Stanovlyansky District, Lipetsk Oblast, a village in Solovyevsky Selsoviet of Stanovlyansky District
- Slobodka, Yeletsky District, Lipetsk Oblast, a village in Volchansky Selsoviet of Yeletsky District

=== Moscow Oblast ===
As of 2012, four rural localities in Moscow Oblast bear this name:

- Slobodka, Klinsky District, Moscow Oblast, a village in Voroninskoye Rural Settlement of Klinsky District
- Slobodka, Nikonovskoye Rural Settlement, Ramensky District, Moscow Oblast, a village in Nikonovskoye Rural Settlement of Ramensky District
- Slobodka, Rybolovskoye Rural Settlement, Ramensky District, Moscow Oblast, a village in Rybolovskoye Rural Settlement of Ramensky District
- Slobodka, Sergiyevo-Posadsky District, Moscow Oblast, a village in Bereznyakovskoye Rural Settlement of Sergiyevo-Posadsky District

=== Novgorod Oblast ===
As of 2012, one rural locality in Novgorod Oblast bears this name:

- Slobodka, Novgorod Oblast, a village in Fedorkovskoye Settlement of Parfinsky District

=== Omsk Oblast ===
As of 2012, one rural locality in Omsk Oblast bears this name:

- Slobodka, Omsk Oblast, a village in Solovetsky Rural Okrug of Nizhneomsky District

=== Orenburg Oblast ===
As of 2012, one rural locality in Orenburg Oblast bears this name:

- Slobodka, Orenburg Oblast, a settlement in Rodinsky Selsoviet of Sorochinsky District

=== Oryol Oblast ===
As of 2012, eleven rural localities in Oryol Oblast bear this name:

- Slobodka, Bolkhovsky District, Oryol Oblast, a settlement in Mikhnevsky Selsoviet of Bolkhovsky District
- Slobodka, Dolzhansky District, Oryol Oblast, a village in Dubrovsky Selsoviet of Dolzhansky District
- Slobodka, Telchensky Selsoviet, Mtsensky District, Oryol Oblast, a village in Telchensky Selsoviet of Mtsensky District
- Slobodka, Voinsky Selsoviet, Mtsensky District, Oryol Oblast, a village in Voinsky Selsoviet of Mtsensky District
- Slobodka, Orlovsky District, Oryol Oblast, a village in Troitsky Selsoviet of Orlovsky District
- Slobodka, Pokrovsky District, Oryol Oblast, a village in Topkovsky Selsoviet of Pokrovsky District
- Slobodka, Shablykinsky District, Oryol Oblast, a village in Somovsky Selsoviet of Shablykinsky District
- Slobodka, Trosnyansky District, Oryol Oblast, a village in Pennovsky Selsoviet of Trosnyansky District
- Slobodka, Uritsky District, Oryol Oblast, a village in Bogdanovsky Selsoviet of Uritsky District
- Slobodka, Glotovsky Selsoviet, Znamensky District, Oryol Oblast, a village in Glotovsky Selsoviet of Znamensky District
- Slobodka, Koptevsky Selsoviet, Znamensky District, Oryol Oblast, a settlement in Koptevsky Selsoviet of Znamensky District

=== Perm Krai ===
As of 2012, one rural locality in Perm Krai bear this name:

- Slobodka, Ilyinsky District, Perm Krai, a village in Ilyinsky District

=== Pskov Oblast ===
As of 2012, two rural localities in Pskov Oblast bear this name:

- Slobodka, Loknyansky District, Pskov Oblast, a village in Loknyansky District
- Slobodka, Novosokolnichesky District, Pskov Oblast, a village in Novosokolnichesky District

=== Ryazan Oblast ===
As of 2012, three rural localities in Ryazan Oblast bear this name:

- Slobodka, Korablinsky District, Ryazan Oblast, a village in Neznanovsky Rural Okrug of Korablinsky District
- Slobodka, Mikhaylovsky District, Ryazan Oblast, a village in Slobodskoy Rural Okrug of Mikhaylovsky District
- Slobodka, Ryazansky District, Ryazan Oblast, a village in Vyshetravinsky Rural Okrug of Ryazansky District

=== Smolensk Oblast ===
As of 2012, two rural localities in Smolensk Oblast bear this name:

- Slobodka, Glinkovsky District, Smolensk Oblast, a village in Romodanovskoye Rural Settlement of Glinkovsky District
- Slobodka, Ugransky District, Smolensk Oblast, a village in Slobodskoye Rural Settlement of Ugransky District

=== Tula Oblast ===
As of 2012, nine rural localities in Tula Oblast bear this name:

- Slobodka, Michurinsky Rural Okrug, Aleksinsky District, Tula Oblast, a village in Michurinsky Rural Okrug of Aleksinsky District
- Slobodka, Sukhodolsky Rural Okrug, Aleksinsky District, Tula Oblast, a village in Sukhodolsky Rural Okrug of Aleksinsky District
- Slobodka, Belyovsky District, Tula Oblast, a village in Bogdanovsky Rural Okrug of Belyovsky District
- Slobodka, Chernsky District, Tula Oblast, a village in Velyenikolskaya Rural Administration of Chernsky District
- Slobodka, Kuznetsovsky Rural Okrug, Kireyevsky District, Tula Oblast, a village in Kuznetsovsky Rural Okrug of Kireyevsky District
- Slobodka, Novoselsky Rural Okrug, Kireyevsky District, Tula Oblast, a village in Novoselsky Rural Okrug of Kireyevsky District
- Slobodka, Leninsky District, Tula Oblast, a selo in Oktyabrsky Rural Okrug of Leninsky District
- Slobodka, Berezovskaya Rural Administration, Odoyevsky District, Tula Oblast, a village in Berezovskaya Rural Administration of Odoyevsky District
- Slobodka, Zhemchuzhnikovskaya Rural Administration, Odoyevsky District, Tula Oblast, a village in Zhemchuzhnikovskaya Rural Administration of Odoyevsky District

=== Tver Oblast ===
As of 2012, seven rural localities in Tver Oblast bear this name:

- Slobodka, Burashevskoye Rural Settlement, Kalininsky District, Tver Oblast, a village in Burashevskoye Rural Settlement of Kalininsky District
- Slobodka, Mednovskoye Rural Settlement, Kalininsky District, Tver Oblast, a village in Mednovskoye Rural Settlement of Kalininsky District
- Slobodka, Verkhnevolzhskoye Rural Settlement, Kalininsky District, Tver Oblast, a village in Verkhnevolzhskoye Rural Settlement of Kalininsky District
- Slobodka, Barykovskoye Rural Settlement, Kashinsky District, Tver Oblast, a village in Barykovskoye Rural Settlement of Kashinsky District
- Slobodka, Verkhnetroitskoye Rural Settlement, Kashinsky District, Tver Oblast, a village in Verkhnetroitskoye Rural Settlement of Kashinsky District
- Slobodka, Kimrsky District, Tver Oblast, a village in Tsentralnoye Rural Settlement of Kimrsky District
- Slobodka, Konakovsky District, Tver Oblast, a village in Ruchyevskoye Rural Settlement of Konakovsky District

=== Vladimir Oblast ===
As of 2012, two rural localities in Vladimir Oblast bear this name:

- Slobodka, Kirzhachsky District, Vladimir Oblast, a village in Kirzhachsky District
- Slobodka, Vyaznikovsky District, Vladimir Oblast, a village in Vyaznikovsky District

=== Vologda Oblast ===
As of 2012, ten rural localities in Vologda Oblast bear this name:

- Slobodka, Kharovsky District, Vologda Oblast, a village in Shevnitsky Selsoviet of Kharovsky District
- Slobodka, Kichmengsko-Gorodetsky District, Vologda Oblast, a selo in Nizhneyenangsky Selsoviet of Kichmengsko-Gorodetsky District
- Slobodka, Mezhdurechensky District, Vologda Oblast, a village in Turovetsky Selsoviet of Mezhdurechensky District
- Slobodka, Nyuksensky District, Vologda Oblast, a village in Gorodishchensky Selsoviet of Nyuksensky District
- Slobodka, Rezhsky Selsoviet, Syamzhensky District, Vologda Oblast, a village in Rezhsky Selsoviet of Syamzhensky District
- Slobodka, Ustretsky Selsoviet, Syamzhensky District, Vologda Oblast, a village in Ustretsky Selsoviet of Syamzhensky District
- Slobodka, Zhityevsky Selsoviet, Syamzhensky District, Vologda Oblast, a village in Zhityevsky Selsoviet of Syamzhensky District
- Slobodka, Tarnogsky District, Vologda Oblast, a village in Markushevsky Selsoviet of Tarnogsky District
- Slobodka, Parfenovsky Selsoviet, Velikoustyugsky District, Vologda Oblast, a village in Parfenovsky Selsoviet of Velikoustyugsky District
- Slobodka, Yudinsky Selsoviet, Velikoustyugsky District, Vologda Oblast, a village in Yudinsky Selsoviet of Velikoustyugsky District

=== Yaroslavl Oblast ===
As of 2012, four rural localities in Yaroslavl Oblast bear this name:

- Slobodka, Bolsheselsky District, Yaroslavl Oblast, a village in Blagoveshchensky Rural Okrug of Bolsheselsky District
- Slobodka, Lyubimsky District, Yaroslavl Oblast, a village in Voskresensky Rural Okrug of Lyubimsky District
- Slobodka, Pereslavsky District, Yaroslavl Oblast, a village in Perelessky Rural Okrug of Pereslavsky District
- Slobodka, Yaroslavsky District, Yaroslavl Oblast, a village in Kurbsky Rural Okrug of Yaroslavsky District

== Abolished localities ==
- Slobodka, Beryozovsky District, Perm Krai, a village in Beryozovsky District of Perm Krai; abolished in December 2011

== Alternative names ==
- Slobodka, alternative name of Sloboda, a village under the administrative jurisdiction of Karachev Urban Administrative Okrug in Karachevsky District of Bryansk Oblast; 53°7′N 35°2′E

== See also ==
- Sloboda (disambiguation)
- Slobodskoy (disambiguation)
