= Nikolay Timofeev-Ressovsky =

Soviet biologist (1900–1981)

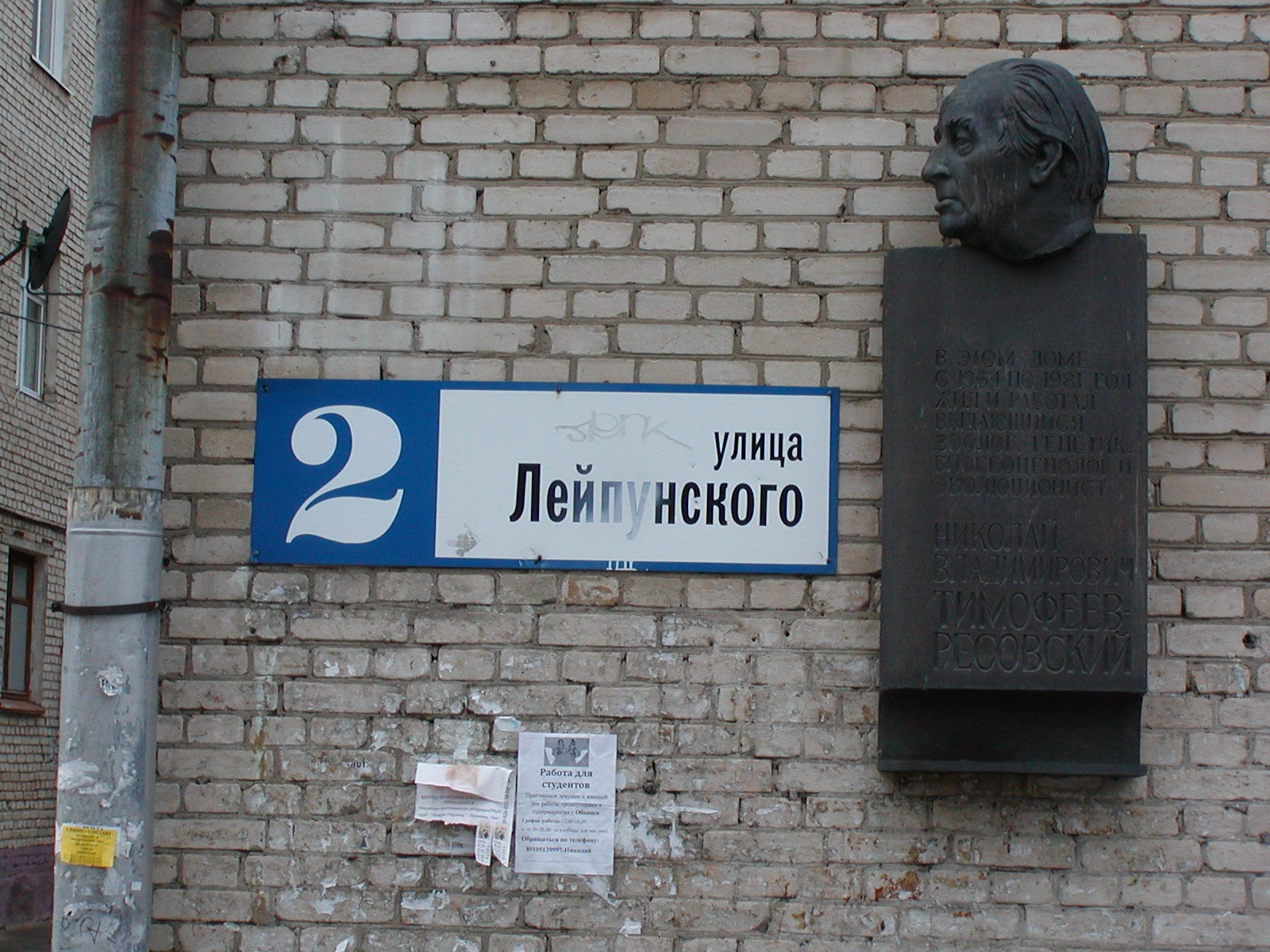
- Memorial plaque in honour of Timofeev-Ressovsky in the house in Obninsk, where he lived
- Born: 20 September [O.S. 7 September] 1900; Moscow, Russian Empire
- Died: 28 March 1981 (aged 80); Moscow, Russia in Soviet Union
- Known for: Research in radiation genetics, experimental population genetics, and microevolution
- Spouse: Elena Aleksandrovna Fidler
- Scientific career
- Fields: Biology
- Academic advisors: Nikolai Koltsov

Nikolay Vladimirovich Timofeev-Ressovsky (Russian: Николай Владимирович Тимофеев-Ресовский, romanized: Nikolay Vladimirovich Timofeyev-Resovskiy; 20 September [O.S. 7 September] 1900 – 28 March 1981) was a Soviet biologist who, in principle, was a senior scientist in Soviet programs of nuclear and, later in biological weapons. He conducted research in radiation genetics, experimental population genetics, and microevolution. His life was highlighted by scientific achievements in the face of severe personal hardship, including his imprisonment and working in secret scientific facilities of Soviet Gulag.

Timofeev-Ressovsky was a descendant of the old Russian school of scientists, characterised by broad naturalistic views on the world, simultaneously combined with exact analysis of causes and consequences and establishment of elementary phenomena. He widely collaborated with physicists. Known for his influential personality, he was a talented story-teller and teacher. He is the author of the term 'genetic engineering'.

== Education ==
Nikolaj Vladimirovich Timofeev-Resovski, began his university education from 1916 to 1917 at the Moscow City People's University named after A. L. Shanyavskij. From 1917 to 1922, he studied at the First Moscow State University.

The First World War and the consequences of the Russian Revolution of 1917 interrupted his education for periods of time. At the outbreak of the Russian Civil War, Timofeev-Resovskij was a follower of the anarchist Peter Kropotkin. In 1918, he volunteered to serve in a small anarchist cavalry unit, which was part of the Green army, i.e., they were neither supporters of the Bolshevik Red army nor the White army of General Anton Ivanovich Denikin. Eventually, in 1919, the anarchists joined the Red army. As a private in the 12th Red Army, Timofeev-Resovskij took part in the last battle of the Civil War in the Crimea on the Polish front.

A paper trail of his education was swept away in the chaos of war. Timofeev-Resovskij abandoned his education without a scientific degree; he left formal education with only a gold medal. Even though he eventually became a recognized world-class scientist, he would later, as a requirement for employment, be required to complete his doctorate. He defended his doctoral dissertation in 1963 in Sverdlovsk, and he was awarded a Doctor of Science diploma in 1964.

== Career ==
=== In Russia ===
During the period 1920 to 1925, Timofeev-Resovskij was an instructor and researcher in Moscow. It was in this period that he met and married Elena Aleksandrovana Fidler (1898 – 1973), who was a student of the cytologist and biologist Nikolaj Konstantinovich Kol’tsov in Moscow; Elena became not only Timofeev-Resovskij's lifelong devoted companion but also his lifelong partner in research. Their eldest son, Dmitrij, was born on 11 September 1923.

From 1920 to 1925, Timofeev-Resovskij was a biology instructor in the pre-Chekist district primary school in Moscow. From 1922 to 1925, he was a zoology instructor on the biotechnical faculty of the Moscow Practical (Applied) Institute. From 1921 to 1925, he did research at the Institute of Experimental Biology, of the Gosudarstvennyj Institut Narodnogo Zdravookhraneniya (GINZ, State Institute of Public Health), under the directorship of N. K. Kol’tsov. Some of his research at the Institute involved Drosophila. It was in a department headed by Sergei Sergeevich Chetverikov, the founder of population genetics and a colleague of Kol’tsov, that Timofeev-Resovskij started his genetics experiments. From 1924 to 1925, he was a research assistant in Kol’tsov's department of zoology at the Medical Pedagogical Institute in Moscow. In 1924, Timofeev-Resovskij began his publications in the field of phenogenetics.

During the period 1923 to 1925, Oskar Vogt, an eminent psychiatrist and neurophysiologist, was a visiting scientist in Moscow; he was director of the Kaiser-Wilhelm Gesellschaft’s Institut für Hirnforschung (KWIH, Kaiser Wilhelm Institute for Brain Research) in Berlin. In part, he was looking to recruit researchers for the KWIH, especially in the relatively new field of genetics. In 1924, the Soviet government made an exchange agreement with Germany. The KWIH was invited to establish a laboratory for brain research in Moscow, which it did: Институт Мозга (Institut Mozga, Institute of the Brain). To reciprocate, the Soviets promised to help set up an experimental laboratory for genetics at the KWIH. Vogt had good relations with Nikolaj Aleksandrovich Semashko, People's Commissioner (Minister) of Health. It was Semashko and Kol’tsov who suggested Timofeev-Resovskij to Vogt. Thus, in the summer of 1925, Timofeev-Resovskij, his wife Elena and his colleague Sergei Romanovich Tsarapkin (Zarapkin), left Russia for an unspecified period of time in Germany, which lasted 20 years.

=== In Germany (1925-1945) ===
Once at the Kaiser-Wilhelm-Institut für Hirnforschung (KWIH Kaiser Wilhelm Institute for Brain Research ), Vogt and Timofeev-Resovskij began implementing the other half of the scientific agreement with Russia. In 1929 Timofeev-Resovskij became director of the Abteilung für Experimentelle Genetik (Department of Experimental Genetics). In 1930, the KWIH moved to its new facility in Berlin-Buch, which was partly financed by a grant from the Rockefeller Foundation. The KWIH, with its departments of Neuroanatomy (Oskar and Cécile Vogt), neurohistology (Alois Kronmüller), Neurochemistry (Marthe Vogt), and genetics (Nikolaij and Elena Timofeev-Resovskij), and its hospital, the KWIH was one of the largest and most modern research facilities of its kind in the entire world. The research conducted in the genetics department, along with the permanent seminar on genetics organized by Timofeev-Resovskij, drew many young postdoctoral researchers who would ultimately become prominent scientists and the department gained the status of an institute; while Timofeev-Resovskij remained a citizen of the Soviet Union for his entire stay in Germany, his status and that of his department were recognized by the fact that he was appointed, in 1938, to the position of scientific member of the Kaiser-Wilhelm Gesellschaft. Timofeev-Resovskij's colleagues in his department included his wife Elena Aleksandrovana Timofeeva-Resovskaja, his Russian colleague Sergei Tsarapkin, the physician and radiation biologist Alexander Catsch (Katsch), the radiochemist Hans-Joachim Born, and the physicist and radiation biologist Karl Zimmer; a technical assistant, Natasha (Natalie) Kromm, was from Russia. Timofeev-Resovskij also collaborated with other eminent scientists including the nuclear chemist Nikolaus Riehl, who was the scientific director of the industrial corporation Auergesellschaft and the biophysicist Max Delbrück, who had studied physics under Niels Bohr and Max Born. Others drawn to Timofeev-Resovskij's department who would go on to become prominent scientists included Hans Bauer and Andriano Buzzati-Traverso. Through 20 years of collaboration with these and many others, Timofeev-Resovskij authored or coauthored over 100 papers written in German, English, Russian, and French. In addition to those already mentioned, Timofeev-Resovskij's scientific circle included the physicists William Astbury, Niels Bohr, P. A. M. Dirac, Pascual Jordan, and Erwin Schrödinger, and the biologists Torbjörn Caspersson, C. D. Darlington, Theodosij Dobzhans’skij, Boris Ephrussi, Åke Gustafsson, J. B. S. Haldane, Hermann Joseph Muller, Nikolai Vavilov, and Vladimir Vernadsky.

Timofeev-Resovskij's second son was born on 9 April 1927.

Together with the French geneticist of Russian origin, Boris Ephrussi, and with the generous support of the Rockefeller Foundation, Timofeev-Resovskij organized an annual conference on biophysics, genetics, and radiation biology. This even continued right up to the start of World War II in 1939.

In 1932, Timofeev-Resovskij attended the 6th International Congress of Genetics, which was held in Ithaca, New York. While there, he formed a friendly relationship with the plant geneticist Nikolaj Vavilov, who was President of the Soviet Adcademy of Agricultural Sciences.

Timofeev-Resovskij stayed in Germany even after Adolf Hitler came to power in 1933. That the Gestapo or the Schutzstaffel (SS) did not give him trouble as a citizen of the Soviet Union is all the more remarkable since Vogt was harassed by the National Socialists for reasons which could have translated into trouble for Timofeev-Resovskij. On the evening of 15–16 March 1933, members of the Sturmabteilung (Storm Troopers) raided Vogt's villa on the grounds of the KWIH. The action had been taken in response to a denunciation by M. H. Fischer, a physiologist at the Institute, who was seeking to rise in the Nationalsozialistische Deutsche Arbeiterpartei (NSDAP, National Socialist Workers Party). The accusations against Vogt included making payments to the Communist Party, maintaining connections to Russia, tolerating Communist staff members, and dismissing National Socialist staff members.

In 1935, Timofeev-Resovskij published the major work, Über die Natur der Genmutation und der Genstruktur, with Karl Zimmer, and Max Delbrück; it was considered to be a major advance in understanding the nature of gene mutation and gene structure. The work was a keystone in the formation of molecular genetics. It was also an inspirational starting point for Erwin Schrödinger's thinking, a course of lectures in 1943, and the eventual writing of the book What Is Life? The Physical Aspect of the Living Cell.

In 1937, Timofeev-Resovskij and Tsarapkin were ordered back to Russia by the Soviet government. Going back to Russia was deemed impossible, as they would have to abandon their equipment and work in progress, as well as their students. Also, once back in Russia and under the political distortions of science and agriculture due to Lysenkoism, they would, at best, have to disparage the work they had accomplished in the preceding 15 years. At the worst, they could be subject to the same fate as many geneticists under Lysenkoism who had been arrested, sent to the Gulag and eventually died or were executed. In 1929, for example, Timofeev-Resovskij's former teacher Sergei Chetverikov had been arrested and exiled. During the period 1936 to 1940, many prominent geneticists, including Vavilov, Georgi Dmitrievich Karpechenko, and Solomon G. Levit, were arrested. Many who were arrested later died in the GULAG or were executed. Timofeev-Resovskij’s younger brothers were arrested; the one in Leningrad was executed, but the one in Irkutsk survived. Many of Elena’s relatives were also arrested and perished. Others, such as Nikolai Koltsov and Boris Astaurov, were dismissed from their positions. In this light, they decided not to return to the USSR.

Also in 1937, while Oskar Vogt had been director of the KWIH since 1919, he was dismissed from his position by the Nazis; he then became director of the Institut für Hirnforschung und allgemeine Biologie (Institute of Brain Research and General Biology) in Neustadt/Schwarzwald. That same year, the Rockefeller Foundation extended an invitation to Timofeev-Resovskij to become head of the Cold Spring Harbor Laboratory of the Carnegie Institution for Science. Timofeev-Resovskij declined the offer, but he had used it to negotiate improved terms for himself and his department at the KWIH.

Timofeev-Resovskij's eldest son Dmitrij, a student at the Humboldt University of Berlin, was arrested in the spring of 1943 for being a member of the Berlin Committee of the All-Union Communist Party (Bolsheviks) and making contact with Russian prisoners of war during World War II. He was sent to the German concentration camp in Mauthausen and executed by the Gestapo on 1 May 1945.

Starting in 1944, in order to minimize the possibility of casualties due to Allied air raids and to also avoid falling into the hands of the Russians, all departments at the KWIH, except for Timofeev-Resovskij's were evacuated from Berlin-Buch to Dillenburg, and later on to Giessen and Göttingen. Timofeev-Resovskij chose to remain in Berlin and await the Russians. He, as well as other German scientists, speculated that the Russian need for scientists would make collaboration with them better than with the Americans, who had far less of a need.

=== In the USSR again ===
The Battle of Berlin was one of the last major engagements of World War II. With a great majority of German scientific facilities in Berlin and its suburbs, this area was a major target of search teams (see Russian Alsos) sent into Germany by Russia to requisition equipment, materiel, and scientific personnel to aid the Soviet atomic bomb project. Haste was necessary, as the American military forces were rapidly approaching Berlin. Soviet troops broke the Berlin defense ring on 25 April 1945, and the Soviet Union announced the fall of Berlin on 2 May. The main search team, headed by Colonel General A. P. Zavenyagin, arrived in Berlin on 3 May; it included Colonel General V. A. Makhnjov, and nuclear physicists Yulij Borisovich Khariton, Isaak Konstantinovich Kikoin, and Lev Andreevich Artsimovich. Georgij Nikolaevich Flerov had arrived earlier, although Kikoin did not recall a vanguard group. Even the scientists were attired in the uniforms of NKVD officers. Targets on the top of their list were the Kaiser-Wilhelm Institut für Physik (KWIP, Kaiser Wilhelm Institute of Physics), the University of Berlin, and the Technische Hochschule Berlin.

A search team soon rounded up Timofeev-Resovskij's colleague Nikolaus Riehl. In early July, Riehl was flown to Russia to head up a group at Plant No. 12 in Ehlektrostal’ (Электросталь) for the production of metallic uranium within the Soviet atomic bomb project. Other colleagues of Timofeev-Resovskij, namely Born, Catsch, and Zimmer, were also sent to Russia to work with Riehl.

After the fall of Berlin, Timofeev-Resovskij was arrested by the Russians. However, Colonel General Zavenyagin recognized that Timofeev-Resovskij's experience in radiobiology and genetic effects of radiation would be useful to the Soviet atomic bomb project and ordered his release. Timofeev-Resovskij became director of the KWIH facility in Berlin-Buch and was visited by Zavenyagin, and also by Igor’ Vasil’evich Kurchatov, chief scientist of the Soviet atomic bomb project. However, after being denounced by a visiting scientist in an Academy of Sciences delegation from Moscow, Timofeev-Resovskij was secretly re-arrested on 14 September by an element of the NKVD different from that under Zavenyagin.

Timofeev-Resovskij and Tsarapkin were sent back to Russia; both were incarcerated in the gulag – Timofeev-Resovskij received a ten-year sentence. On his way to the prison camp in Karaganda in northern Kazakhstan, one of the most terrible camps in the GULAG, Timofeev-Resovskij went through the Butyrskaya prison, the central transit prison in Moscow. It was there that he met Aleksandr Solzhenitsyn. Even in prison, Solzhenitsyn noted, Timofeev-Resovskij organized a scientific seminar. He made a presentation on the biophysical analysis of mutations. Himself he was strongly impressed by the talk of unknown priest about "shameless death". The harsh conditions of his transportation and incarceration in the labor camp contributed to a significant decline in Timofeev-Resovskij's health, including the degradation of his vision brought on by malnutrition.

Frédéric Joliot-Curie, a Nobel Laureate in Chemistry and a leader in the French Resistance during the war, visited Moscow and pleaded with Lavrentij Beria, the head of the NKVD, that Timofeev-Resovskij should be found and given meaningful work. The argument did not fall on deaf ears, as Beria was also in charge of the Soviet atomic bomb project, and this was a top priority for Joseph Stalin. Eventually, Timofeev-Resovskij was found, treated for his ill health brought on by his incarceration in the GULAG, and was sent, in 1947, to work at Laboratory B in Sungul, which was a ShARAShKA. While he was still a prisoner, he headed up the biological division at the institute and was allowed to apply his prodigious scientific skills to the problems of the day. His wife Elena, after receipt of a letter in Timofeev-Resovskij's hand, left Berlin in 1948, with their son Andrew, to join him in Sungul'. The house occupied by the three Timofeev-Resovskijs was every bit as nice as that planned for the German scientists working at the Sungul' institute.

Nikolaus Riehl found out that Timofeev-Resovskij was in Sungul and had vision problems brought on by the malnutrition he suffered in the GULAG. Riehl studied the effects of vitamins on vision and determined a course of treatment. He acquired the necessary vitamins and had Zavenyagin send them on to Timofeev-Resovskij, but the actions were to no avail, as the condition was not reversible.

After the detonation of the Russian uranium bomb, uranium production was going smoothly and Riehl's oversight was no longer necessary at Plant No. 12. Riehl then went, in 1950, to head "Laboratory B", where he stayed until 1952. Laboratory B was responsible for the handling, treatment, and use of radioactive products generated in reactors, as well as radiation biology, dosimetry, and radiochemistry. Laboratory B, as a Sharashka and a facility in the Soviet atomic bomb project, was overseen by the 9th Chief Directorate of the NKVD (MVD after 1946).

Laboratory B was known under another cover name as Объект 0211 (Ob’ekt 0211, Object 0211), as well as Object B. (In 1955, Laboratory B was closed. Some of its personnel were transferred elsewhere, but most of them were assimilated into a new, second nuclear weapons institute, Scientific Research Institute-1011 (NII-1011), today known as the Russian Federal Nuclear Center All-Russian Scientific Research Institute of Technical Physics, RFYaTs–VNIITF.)

Timofeev-Resovskij headed the radiobiology department at Laboratory B, and another political prisoner from the Gulag, S. A. Voznesenskij, headed the radiochemistry department. In Timofeev-Resovskij's department, Born, Catsch, and Zimmer were able to conduct work similar to that which they had done in Germany, and all three became section heads in the department. Tsarapkin, Timofeev-Resovskij's long-time colleague was also at Laboratory B.

Before being rejoined in the Soviet Union, Zimmer, Timofeev-Resovskij, and Riehl had collaborated on the biological effects of ionizing radiation. Also, Zimmer and Timofeev-Resovskij had put together a manuscript which was a comprehensive summary of their work and that of others on radiation-induced gene mutation and related areas; the book, Das Trefferprinzip in der Biologie, was published in Germany while they were in the Soviet Union. In 1948, due to Lysenkoism, there were grave consequences for the institute in Sungul' in general and for Zimmer and Timofeev-Resovskij in particular. The book was put on a forbidden list and the laboratory was not allowed to conduct research on its topics.

In 1955, Laboratory B was merged into the newly created second nuclear weapons design institute Nauchno-Issledovatel’skij Institut-1011 (NII-1011). During the merger, the radiopathology section of S. A. Voznesenskij's radiochemistry department was transferred to Combine No. 817 (Ozersk), and Timofeev-Resovskij and 16 members of his department were transferred to the Ural Branch of the USSR Academy of Sciences, in Sverdlovsk (now Ekaterinburg). After discharge from the Sharashka, Timofeev-Resovskij visited Moscow, Leningrad, and Kiev. In these locations, he was able to visit physicists Peter Kapitsa, Lev Landau, and Igor’ Tamm, the biologist M. V. Volkenstein, and the mathematician A. A. Lapunov. In Sverdlovsk, Timofeev-Resovskij organized and became the head of the Department of Radiobiology of the Ural Branch of the Academy of Sciences. In 1956, he also founded an experimental station and summer school at the nearby Lake Miassovo. The experimental station conducted radiological research on radiation and population genetics. This summer school contributed to keeping classical genetics alive during the period of Lysenkoism, which officially ended in 1964.

The Miassovo summer school became famous among Soviet scholars and students. Among the lecturers were mathematicians Aleksei Lyapunov and Ivan Poletaev, biophysicists Lev Blumenfeldt and Mikhail Volkenstein, biochemist Simon Shnol, geneticist Raisa Berg and Vladimir Efroimson. The school produced numerous geneticists, ecosystem biologists, biophysicists and radiation biologists.

In 1964, Timofeev-Resovskij organized and became the head of the Department of Radiobiology and Genetics, at the Institute of Medical Radiology of the USSR Academy of Medical Sciences, in Obninsk, Kaluga District. In the department, Timofeev-Resovskij supervised and headed the Laboratory of Radiation Genetics and the Laboratory of Radiation Ecology. There were two other laboratories in the department, the Laboratory of Cellular Radiobiology, headed by V. I. Korogodin, and the Laboratory of Molecular Radiobiology, headed by Zhores Medvedev. The first group in the USSR to study Arabidopsis thaliana was established by Timofeev-Resovskij during his time in Obninsk. Two well known figures in genetics started their research and received their degrees at Obninsk under Timofeev-Resovskij. One was Nikolai Bochkov, director of the Institute of Medical Genetics, in Moscow; the other was Vladimir Ivanov, head of the Laboratory of Experimental Genetics at the same institute. While in Obninsk, Timofeev-Resovskij wrote two books (published in 1968 and 1969 – see the book list below) and more than 60 papers on population genetics, radiation biology, and evolution. His wife Helena assisted him by providing her eyes to compensate for his lost vision, taking dictation, and editing his papers.

In 1968, even though Lysenkoism was officially over, its supporters were able to block Timofeev-Resovskij's nomination to the Soviet Academy of Sciences. In 1969, they used their influence to pressure him into retirement from Institute of Medical Radiaology, whereupon Timofeev-Resovskij became a consultant to the Institute of Medical-Biological Problems and of Developmental Biology, in Moscow. As a consultant for the institute, he studied space medicine and continued his research on genetics. He also served as a consultant to the Institute of Developmental Problems, in Moscow, as well as Moscow State University. With several of his students, he also wrote his last book, Introduction to Molecular Radiobiology: Physico-Chemical Foundations [in Russian], which was published in 1981.

Timofeev-Resovskij was a non-rehabilitated ex-prisoner and was therefore not allowed to leave the Soviet Union. He was, however, able to meet foreign colleagues who came to Russia. In 1969, a short time before receipt of his Nobel Prize, Max Delbrück traveled to the Soviet Union and unofficially met with Timofeev-Resovskij. In addition to once again seeing his colleague Timofeev-Resovskij, Delbrück hoped to appeal to the Soviet authorities to mitigate his colleague's harsh living conditions; however, he was not given an opportunity to bring his request to the attention of the authorities. Timofeev-Resovskij, also met with foreign colleagues attending conferences, such as at the Second Meeting of the Vavilov Society of Genetics and Selection (Moscow, 1972) and at the 14th International Congress of Genetics (Moscow, 1978).

Timofeev-Resovskij's lifelong companion and scientific research partner, Helena, died on 29 April 1973. At this time, their son, Andrew, was a physics professor at the University of Sverdlovsk (now Ekaterinburg).

Timofeev-Ressovsky died in Obninsk, in a hospital room of the Institute of Medical Radiology (IMR) on 28 March 1981. He was buried at the Konchalovskoe cemetery in Obninsk.

A minor planet 3238 Timresovia discovered by Soviet astronomer Nikolai Stepanovich Chernykh in 1975 is named after him.

Timofeev was a person, who belonged to three generations and epochs.

=== Postscript ===
Daniil Aleksandrovich Granin's novel Зубр (translated as The Bison: A Novel about the Scientist Who Defied Stalin [1990]) appeared in Russia in 1987, during the dawn of glasnost’ and perestrojka. The book depicted the life of Timofeev-Resovskij and the impact of Joseph Stalin on biology. The West German edition, Der Genetiker (The Geneticist), published in Köln, appeared in 1988. The East German edition was published under the title Sie nannten ihn Ur (They Called Him Ur).

On 16 October 1991, the prosecutor general of the USSR stated that the charge of treason against Timofeev-Resovskij in 1946 had no legal basis. The next year, Timofeev-Resovskij was rehabilitated, 11 years after his death!

On the Campus Berlin-Buch, a modern science, health and biotechnology park focused on biomedicine, commemoration of Timofeev-Resovskij took several forms; a new medical Genomics building was named after him, a memorial plaque was dedicated in 1992 on the gatehouse where he lived, and a sculpture of him, created by Stevan Kaehne in 2006, stands in front of the Timofeev-Resovskij Research Building.

A centennial anniversary celebration was held in both Dubna and on the Berlin-Buch Campus in September 2000. Timofeev-Resovskij's son, Andrew, a physicist, took part in both centennial conferences. In 2005, the 70th anniversary of the publishing of the “green paper”, "Über die Natur der Genmutation und der Genstruktur", by Timofeev-Ressovkij, Zimmer, and Delbrück, was celebrated by a jointly sponsored symposium in Yerevan; the sponsors were the Yerevan Physics Institute and Armenian, Russian, and U.S. genetics associations.

== Scientific associations ==
Timofeev-Resovskij was a member of the following organizations and societies:

- Academician (active member) in the Deutsche Akademie der Leopoldina (German Academy of Sciences Leopoldina) in Halle from 1940
- Fellow of the Moskovskoe Obshchestvo Isp’itatelej Prirody (MOIP) (Moscow Society of Naturalists)
- Fellow of the Vsesoyuznovo Geograficheskogo Obshchestva SSSR (All-union Geographical Society USSR)
- Fellow of the Vsesoyuznogo Botanicheskogo Obshchestva SSSR (All-union Botanical Society USSR)
- Founding member of the German Biophysical Society
- Honorary member of the American Academy of Arts and Sciences, Boston, USA
- Honorary member of the Italian Society of Experimental Biology
- Honorary member of the Genetics Society, Leeds, Great Britain
- Honorary member of the Mendelian Society in Lund, Sweden
- Honorary member and founding member of the Vavilovskoe Obshchestvo Genetikov i Selektsionerov (VOGiS) imeni N. I. Vavilov (Vavilov Society of Genetics and Selection in the name of N. I. Vavilov), USSR
- Scientific member of the Kaiser-Wilhelm-Gesellschaft zur Förderung der Wissenschaften (Kaiser Wilhelm Society for the Advancement of the Sciences) from 1938. [After World War II, the Society was renamed the Max-Planck-Gesellschaft zur Förderung der Wissenschaften.]

== Honors ==
Timofeev-Resovskij was not allowed to personally accept the honors bestowed upon him after 1945. From 1945 he was a prisoner and from 1955 he was a non-rehabilitated ex-prisoner and was therefore not allowed to leave the Soviet Union. The following honors were awarded to him:

- Darwin Medal, Deutsche Akademie der Leopoldina (German Academy of Sciences Leopoldina) – 1959
- Mendel Medal, Czechoslovak Academy of Sciences – 1965
- Kimber Genetics Award, U.S. National Academy of Sciences – 1966
- Gregor Mendel Medal, Deutsche Akademie der Leopoldina (German Academy of Sciences Leopoldina) – 1970
- Lazzaro Spallanzani Medal, Italy

== Legacy and Memory ==
- A memorial plaque dedicated to Timofeev-Ressovsky is installed on the building of the regional executive committee in Chelyabinsk. Another memorial plaque is located in Obninsk on the house where he lived.
- His biography served as the basis for the documentary novel The Bison (Zubr) by Daniil Granin.
- The history of the Berlin-Buch laboratory was reflected in the novel Berlin Wild by Elly Welt, in which the participants are depicted under fictional names while remaining recognisable.
- Collections of audio recordings containing Timofeev-Ressovsky’s oral recollections are preserved in the sound archive of Pushchino and in the Oral History Department of the Fundamental Library of Moscow State University; many of these recordings have subsequently been published as memoirs.
- A scientific medal, the N. V. Timofeev-Ressovsky Medal “Biosphere and Humanity”, was established in his honour.
- The minor planet 3238 Timresovia (1975 VB9), discovered on 8 November 1975 by Soviet astronomer Nikolai Chernykh, was named in honour of Timofeev-Ressovsky.
- In 2000, UNESCO declared the year a commemorative year dedicated to Timofeev-Ressovsky.
- In Yekaterinburg, one of the newly built streets was initially given the name of Timofeev-Ressovsky as a construction address; however, in 2020 it was officially renamed after academician Vasily Parin. According to media reports, local authorities did not approve the original name, citing Timofeev-Ressovsky’s allegedly controversial role in history.
- Timofeev-Ressovsky’s genetic research was the subject of the section Muska in the art project The Ringing Trace by Russian artist Pavel Otdelnov. The project was presented at the 6th Ural Industrial Biennial of Contemporary Art in 2021 and took place in a former dormitory for scientists of the secret Laboratory “B” in the settlement of Sokol, Chelyabinsk Oblast.
- In 2025, the installation Biostation by artist Sergey Denikin, dedicated to Timofeev-Ressovsky, was presented at the Ural Industrial Biennial of Contemporary Art.

== Bibliography ==
Articles

- N. W. Timoféeff-Ressovsky and O. Vogt Über idiosomatische Variationsgruppen und ihre Bedeutung für die Klassifikation der Krankheiten, Die Naturwissenschaften Volume 14, Issue 50-51, 1188-1190 (1926).
- N. W. Timofeff-Ressovsky Studies on the phenotype manifestation of hereditary factors. I. On the phenotypic manifestation of the genovariation radius incompletus in Drosophila funebris., Genetics 128-198 (1927). The author was identified as being at the Institute of Experimental Biology, Moscow, Russia. The article was received on 21 August 1926.
- H. A. Timoféeff-Ressovsky and N. W. Timoféeff-Ressovsky Genetische Analyse einer freilebenden Drosophila melanogaster-Population, Development Genes and Evolution Volume 109, Number 1, 70-109 (1927). The authors were identified as being at the Genetischen Abteilung des Kaiser Wilhelm-Instituts für Hirnforschung, Berlin, Germany. The article was submitted on 18 October 1926.
- N. W. Timofeeff-Ressovsky The Effect of X-Rays in Producing Somatic Genovariations of a Definite Locus in Different Directions in Drosophila melanogaster, The American Naturalist, Volume 63, Number 685, 118-124 (1929)
- Timofeeff-Ressovky, N. W., K. G. Zimmer, and M. Delbrück Über die Natur der Genmutation und der Genstruktur, Nachrichten von der Gesellschaft der Wissenschaften zu Göttingen: Mathematische-Physikalische Klasse, Fachgruppe VI, Biologie Bd. 1, Nr. 13, 189-245 (1935). Timofeeff-Ressovsky was identified as being from the Genetische Abteilung des Kaiser-Wilhelm-Instituts für Hirnforschung in Berlin-Buch. Zimmer was identified as being from the Strahlenabteilung des Cecilienhauses in Berlin-Charlottenburg. Delbrück was identified as being from the Physikalische-Radioaktive Abteilung des Kaiser-Wilhelm-Instituts für Chemie in Berlin-Dahlem. This paper, from the color of the journal’s cover, has become known as the “Green Pamphlet” and sometimes as the Dreimännerarbeit (Three-Man Paper) of genetics, to distinguish it from the historical Dreimännerarbeit by Max Born, Werner Heisenberg, and Pascual Jordan, which launched quantum Matrix mechanics in 1925.
- Timoféeff-Ressovsky, N. W. Genetik und Evolution (Bericht eines Zoologen), Journal Molecular and General Genetics Volume 76, Number 1, 158-219 (1939). The author was identified as being at the Genetische Abteilung des Kaiser Wilhelm-Instituts, Berlin-Buch, Germany. The article is from an address given at the Versammlung der Deutschen Gesellschaft für Vererbungswissenschaft in Würzburg on 25 September 1938.
- N. Riehl, N. V. Timofeev-Resovskij, and K. G. Zimmer Mechanismus der Wirkung ionisierender Strahlen auf biologische Elementareinheiten, Die Naturwissenschaften Volume 29, Numbers 42-43, 625-639 (1941). Riehl was identified as being in Berlin, and the other two were identified as being in Berlin-Buch.
- H. J. Born, N. W. Timoféeff-Ressovsky and K. G. Zimmer Biologische Anwendungen des Zählrohres, Naturwissenschaften Volume 30, Number 40, 600-603 (1942). The authors were identified as being in the genetics department of the Kaiser Wilhelm Institute in Berlin-Buch.
- N. Riehl, R. Rompe, N. W. Timoféeff-Ressovsky und K. G. Zimmer Über Energiewanderungsvorgänge und Ihre Bedeutung Für Einige Biologische Prozesse, Protoplasma Volume 38, Number 1, 105-126 (1943). The article was received on 19 April 1943.

Books

- N. W. Timofeeff-Ressovsky, Experimentelle Mutationsforschung in der Vererbungslehre. Beeinflussung der erbanlagen durch strahlung und andere faktoren. (Theodor Steinkopff, 1937)
- Nikolaj V. Timofeev-Ressovskij and Karl Günter Zimmer Biophysik. Bd. 1. Das Trefferprinzip in der Biologie (Hirzel, 1947)
- N. V. Timofeeff-Ressovsky, V. I. Ivanov, and V. I. Korogodin Application of the “Hit” Principle in Radiobiology [In Russian] (Atomisdat, 1968)
- N. W. Timofeeff-Ressovsky, N. N. Vorontsov, and A. V. Jablokov A Brief Review of the Theory of Evolution [In Russian] (Nauka, 1969)
- N. W. Timofeeff-Ressovsky, A. V. Jablokov, and N. V. Glotov A Review of the Theory of Populations [In Russian] (Nauka, 1973)
- N. W. Timofeeff-Ressovsky, N. N. Voroncov, and A. N. Jablokov Kurzer Grundriß der Evolutionstheorie (Fischer Verlag, 1975)
- N. W. Timofeeff-Ressovsky, A. N. Jablokov, and N. V. Glotov, Grundriß der Populationslehre (Fischer Verlag, 1977)
- N. W. Timofeeff-Ressovsky, A. V. Savich, and M. I. Shal'nov Introduction to Molecular Radiobiology: Physico-Chemical Foundations [In Russian] (Medicina, 1981)
- N. V. Timofeeff-Ressovsky The Stories Told by Himself with Letters, Photos and Documents [In Russian] (Soglasie, 2000)
