= Boris Astaurov =

Russian and Soviet geneticist

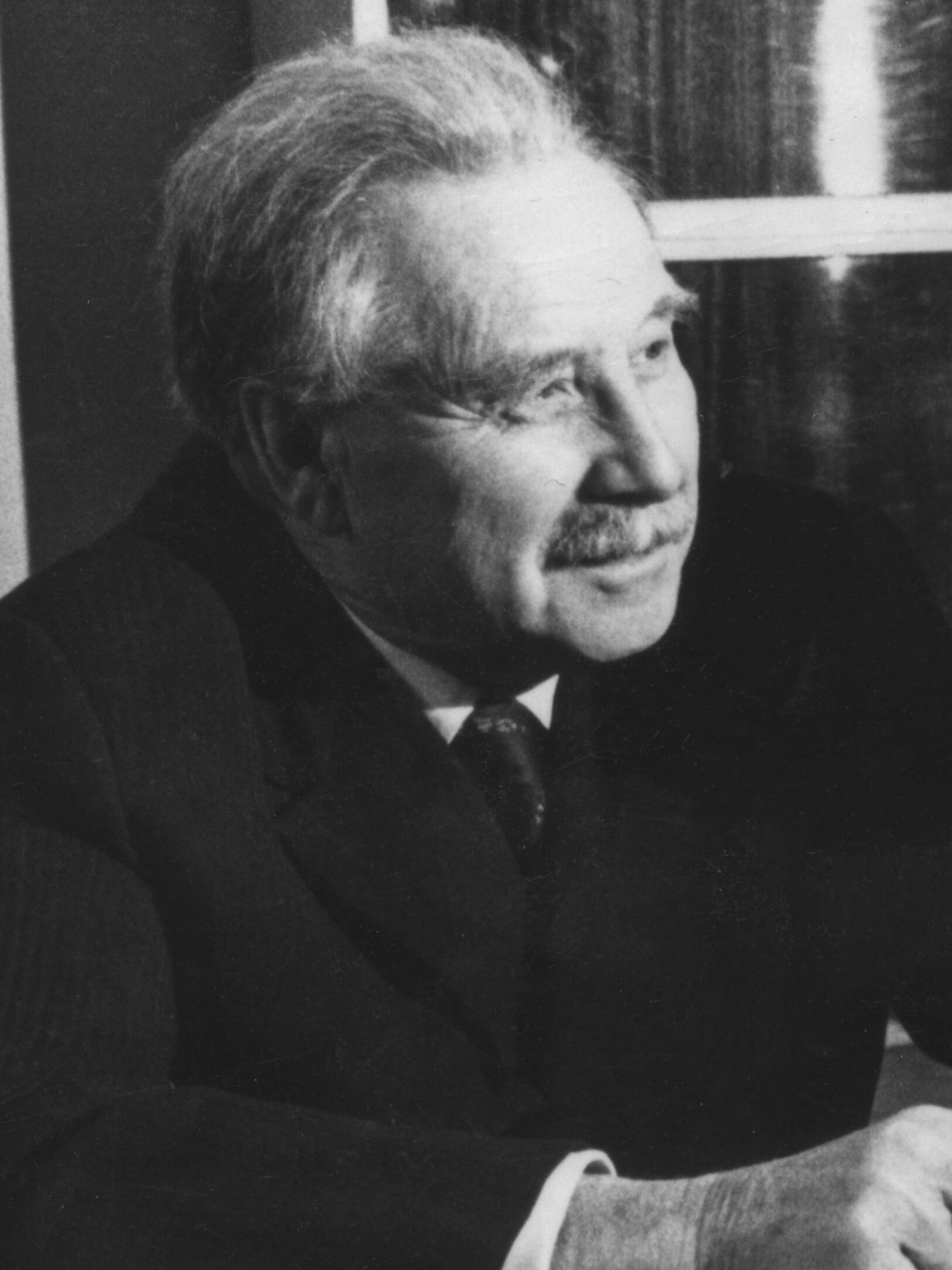
- 8 April 1974
- Born: 27 October 1904; Moscow
- Died: 21 June 1974 (aged 69); Moscow
- Known for: Silkworm breeding
- Scientific career
- Fields: Genetics, animal breedin
- Workplaces: Laboratory of Developmental Mechanics in Moscow
- Academic advisors: N. K. Koltsov, Sergei Chetverikov

Boris Lvovich Astaurov (27 October 1904 – 21 June 1974) was a Soviet and Russian biologist and geneticist who worked on breeding experiments including pioneering work on silkworms, in which he demonstrated the induction of parthenogenesis, polyploidy, and cloning. He produced fertile tetraploid hybrids of the silkworm species Bombyx mori and Bombyx mandarina. Astaurov was among the few Mendelian geneticists who survived Stalin's purge.

== Life and work ==
Astaurov was born in Moscow to eye surgeon Lev M. Astaurov and gynaecologist Olga A. Tikhenko. His father had trained in Kazan while his mother had studied in Sorbonne and Lyon and the family ran a private medical practice. Astaurov went to the Flerov gymnasium where his contemporaries included B.V. Kedrovsky, Nikolay Timofeev-Ressovsky, Alexander Gurwitsch, and G.K. Khrushchov. Astaurov was very good at drawing and learned piano with Boris Chaliapin under professor Feodor Koenemann. After graduating in 1921 he joined the Moscow University and after receiving a degree in 1927 he went to study zoology under N. K. Koltsov. In 1926 he went to work in the laboratory of Sergei Chetverikov, to study the genetics of Drosophila populations. His studies were on the mutant tetraptera with four wings. He went to study the genetics and breeding of Arabian and Bactrian camels in Kazakhstan and Turkmenistan from 1928 to 1929. His PhD could not be completed due to the arrest and deportation of Chetverikov based on the allegations made by Trofim Lysenko that Mendelian geneticists were fascists under Stalin's rule. Astaurov moved to Tashkent and joined the sericulture and silk research institute there. He demonstrated artificially induced parthenogenesis in silkworm eggs. In 1936 he returned to Moscow and was able to complete his doctorate. In 1942, after the death of Dmitriy Filatov, Astaurov continued to work at the Laboratory of Developmental Mechanics in Moscow and was made head of the department from 1947. After 1948, although not directly targeted by Lysenko, he was decreed to not work on silkworm but instead to study fish. After Stalin's death, he returned to study silkworm. The Tenth Genetics Congress at Montreal included a Soviet delegation consisting of Lysenkoists with the exception of Astaurov who refused to join the delegation.

In 1974, a researcher working with Astaurov went to attend a meeting in Italy and defected. Astaurov was called to a meeting of the Soviet Academy where he was questioned about the "unpatriotic act" of his collaborator. He returned home from the meeting and died from a heart failure.
