= Formozov =

Formozov (Russian: Формозов), or Formozova (feminine; Формозова), is a Russian last name (from Latin: formosus) and may refer to:

- Aleksandr Aleksandrovich Formozov (1928–2009) — Soviet and Russian archaeologist and historian.
- Aleksandr Nikolaevich Formozov (1899–1973) — Soviet biologist.
- Nikolay Aleksandrovich Formozov (born 1955) — Soviet and Russian ecologist and biologist.
