= Alexander Serebrovsky =

Alexander Serebrovsky may refer to:

- Alexander Serebrovsky (engineer) (1884-1938), Russian revolutionary and Soviet petroleum and mining engineer
- Alexander Serebrovsky (geneticist) (1892-1948), Russian geneticist, poultry breeder, and eugenicist
