= Aleksandr Promptov =

Aleksandr Nikolaevich Promptov (also spelled as Promptoff) (27 June 1898, Sevastopol - 11 November 1948, Koltushi) was a Russian and Soviet geneticist and ornithologist who studied bird calls, made recordings and suggested the role of vocalization and behavior in isolation and speciation.

== Career ==
Promptov was born in the family of a high-ranking Russian revenue official. He went to school in Kostroma and graduated from the Nechaev gymnasium in Moscow. Even as a young boy, he took an interest in birds but he chose to study experimental zoology rather than ornithology. It is thought that his choice may have been aided by family ties to Nikolai Koltsov. Promptov's and Koltsov's mothers were related and Koltsov influenced the authorities to let Promptov study the genetics of fowl under Alexander Serebrovsky, a former student of Koltsov, in a project funded by the People's Commissariat of Agriculture.

Promptov graduated in 1923 and joined the University in the department of genetics. He contributed to a translation of T.H. Morgan's Physical Basis of Heredity into Russian and joined Sergei Chetverikov's research team working on Drosophila. In 1926 he started research at Moscow University's Institute of Zoology on pleiotropism and polymorphism in Drosophila genetics. Throughout this period, he continued to take an interest in field ornithology and began to explore many aspects of avian biology including song learning and hybridization of finches. After defending his dissertation in 1929 he made a trip to the Urals to study song variation in several bird species. Returning after two months, he took up a job of a lecturer in general biology. He gradually intensified his studies in ornithology and in 1937 he produced a 400-page manual of field ornithology, Птицы в природе ("birds in nature") which is still considered a classic. It included calls described in his own notations. Promptov also pioneered bird sound recording in the USSR with an instrument that made use of photographic film.

Another work of his was based on the songs of chaffinches. Based on song variations he divided the populations across the Soviet Union into several units and found that because although the birds migrated, the males tended to return to their natal grounds allowing geographic isolation of song even though learning was involved. In 1940 he moved to an Ornithological Laboratory at the Institute of Evolutionary Physiology and Pathology of Higher Nervous Activity which had been established in Koltushi by Ivan Pavlov and then directed by his student Leon Orbeli. He began to study species specific stereotyped behaviour in birds but the war broke out. Promptov stayed at the Institute through the war and after the war, he was visited by Julian Huxley who reported that it was the only work on the genetics of behaviour in wild birds that he knew of. On November 11, 1948 Promptov committed suicide. Some of his work was posthumously published by his wife Elizaveta Lukina (who was also a research collaborator).

Promptov examined speciation processes and noted that song variation was through both heredity and learning. Promptov's speciation concept was ignored by proponents of the modern evolutionary synthesis.
