= Helena Alexandrovna Timofeeff-Ressovsky =

Russian biologist

- Born: June 21, 1898; Moscow, Russia
- Died: April 29, 1973 (aged 74); Obinsk, USSR
- Scientific career
- Fields: Population genetics, radiation ecology
- Workplaces: Kaiser Wilhelm Institute for Brain Research, Institute for Medical Radiology

Helena Alexandrovna Timofeeff-Ressovsky (June 21, 1898 – April 29, 1973) was a Russian biologist known for her work in developmental and population genetics and radiation ecology.

== Early and personal life ==
Helena's father, Aleksandr Fidler, ran a private girls' school. She and her siblings (two brothers and six sisters) were well-educated; some of her sisters studied chemistry and musicology. Helena met her future husband, Nikolai Vladimirovich, while studying biology and zoology in Moscow.

The couple had two sons, Dmitry (born 1923) and Andrei (born 1927). Accused of antifascist activities in Germany, Dmitry was arrested in 1943 and died in the concentration camp in Mauthausen. Andrei became a physicist.

== Scientific career ==
Helena and Nikolai co-authored a dozen papers that shaped developmental genetics. Their studies of Drosophila funebris in the 1920s explored the concepts of penetrance and expressivity. In response to Muller's X-ray experiments in the late 1920s, they turned their attention to mutation and population genetics. A 1927 paper provided the first experimental proof of concealed genetic variability.

On the recommendation of N. K. Koltsov, director of Moscow's Institute of Experimental Biology, the Timofeef-Ressovskys were recruited by Oskar Vogt to work at Berlin's Kaiser Wilhelm Institute for Brain Research in 1925. Official reluctance to let the couple leave Russia and enter Germany were overcome in part due to Helena's German ancestry. A number of other Russians, including Sergei R. Zarapkin and his family, technical assistant Natalie Kromm, and the Timofeeff-Ressovskys' nanny, were in residence at the Institute. Berlin was a comfortable place for women in the sciences: Cécile and Marthe Vogt, Estera Tenenbaum, Stella Rose, Rosa Schragenheim, Irmgard Leux, and Gertrud Soeken also worked at the Institute.

Following the Nazi rise to power in 1933, the political climate became increasingly uncomfortable in Germany. The Institute was pressured to dismiss foreigners, women, and Jews. Helena officially retired, though she continued to collaborate with her husband. Despite the efforts of Nikolai and Oskar Vogt, Tenenbaum was forced out of the Institute (and country) in 1934; facilitated by a research grant, Marthe Vogt left Germany in 1935. The situation in the Soviet Union was perilous: members of Nikolai and Helena's families were arrested and some were killed. Colleagues warned against returning home; when ordered to do so in 1937, Nikolai refused. He used competing offers from the United States to negotiate improved working conditions in his Berlin laboratory.

Helena's eldest son was arrested by the Germans in 1943 and her husband by the Russians in 1945. Their fate remained uncertain, but Helena was able to continue working in Berlin while her younger son resumed his studies. From 1946-1947, she worked under Hans Nachtsheim at Berlin University's Zoological Institute. In 1947, she received word that Nikolai was alive, and in August Helena and Andrei joined him in the Urals.

Helena once more worked as a researcher in a department headed by her husband, first in the Urals and then, for the last decade of her life, the Institute of Medical Radiology near Moscow. She continued her scientific work, though she received no salary and opportunities for publication were often limited by the secret nature of her work. During this period, she worked on problems of radiation ecology and population genetics, though the study of genetics was generally disallowed in the Soviet Union until the mid-60s. She was part of the first group in the USSR to study Arabidopsis genetics.

Helena died in 1973; the loss was a serious blow for the husband whose scientific work and political travails had always overshadowed hers. The Max Delbrück Center for Molecular Medicine hosts a lecture series named in Helena's honor.
