= Vladimir Efroimson =

Soviet geneticist

Vladimir Pavlovich Efroimson Владимир Павлович Эфроимсон
- Book cover of Genetics of Genius book by Efraimson published posthumously. The black-and-white photo in the bottom is of Efroimson himself
- Born: 21 November 1908; Moscow, Moskovsky Uyezd, Moscow Governorate, Russian Empire
- Died: 21 July 1989 (aged 80); Moscow, Russian SFSR, Soviet Union
- Citizenship: Soviet Union
- Education: Moscow State University
- Known for: Mutation rate, Medical genetics, Genetics of social behavior
- Scientific career
- Fields: genetics

Vladimir Pavlovich Efroimson (Russian: Владимир Павлович Эфроимсон; 21 November 1908, Moscow – 21 July 1989, Moscow) was one of the most prominent Soviet geneticists, a former student of Nikolai Koltsov, who was among the scientists who had to struggle against the persecution of geneticists in the Stalinist era of the Soviet Union. He studied mutations and human genetics and was among the first to estimate the rate of spontaneous mutations in human genes in 1932 although this was published first by J.B.S. Haldane.

== Life and work ==
Efroimson was born at the Lubyanka All-Russia Insurance Company revenue house in Moscow (which was turned into the headquarters of the Soviet secret police after the October Revolution), the son of a banker and a nurse. He studied in an elite bilingual German school and entered the Biology division of Math and Physics Faculty of Moscow State University in 1925, where he studied under Nikolai Koltsov. In 1929 he was expelled from the university for his speech against the persecution of his teacher Sergei Chetverikov, the founder of population genetics. In 1929-1931 Efroimson worked in the Trans-Caucasian Institute for Silk Worm Growing in Tbilisi. In 1929-1931 he worked in Moscow Radiation Institute. In 1932 he published six scientific works and discovered the formula of mutation rate in humans. In December 1932 he was arrested for his participation in the "Free Philosophic Society". In 1935 he was freed from labour camps in the Altai region. He started to work for the Central Asian Institute for Silk Worm Growing. In one and a half years he made important discoveries in the silkworm genetics. In 1937 he was expelled from the institute under pretext of inefficiency at work, and the pure-bred lines of silkworms he had bred were killed and copies his book Genetics of Silkworm published by the USSR Academy of Sciences were destroyed. In 1939-1941 he worked for the All-Ukrainian Silkworm Station in Merefa and obtained his Candidate of Sciences degree from Kharkov University (1941).

During World War II Efroimson worked on the warfront as an epidemiologist, paramedic, and a German-speaking intelligence member from August 1942 through November 1945 and was awarded military decorations. In February 1945 he reported to the Military Council of his Army about unacceptable excesses against German civilians including the mass rape of German women.

In 1946-1948 he worked as a docent for Kharkov University and obtained his Doctor of Sciences degree (1947). In August 1948, after the infamous VASKhNIL session there Lysenkoists destroyed scientific genetics Efroimson was stripped of his doctoral degree and expelled from his teaching position for translating into Russian, a negative review of Trofim Lysenko's work published by Theodosius Dobzhansky. Efroimson also wrote a report On the Criminal Activities by Trofim Lysenko. In 1949 Efroimson was sentenced for his Libel against the Red Army to seven years in Gulag (served in Steplag). The formal reason for his arrest was his February 1945 report about the violence against German civilians although the real reason was probably his criticism of Lysenko. In 1956, after being freed from the camps he wrote reports to the Prosecutor General of the USSR On undermining of the agriculture in the Soviet Union and the international authority of Soviet science and On the losses caused by pseudo-innovations in agricultural biology. In 1956-1961 he worked as a librarian in the Library of Foreign Literature, Moscow (1961); since 1961 he worked for Mechnikov Institute of Vaccines and Serums. In 1962 his doctoral degree was returned to him. In 1965 he received prestigious Mendel medal. In 1968 Efroimson became the head of the genetics department of Moscow Institute for Psychiatry. In 1976-1989 he was a consultant for the Institute of Development Biology of the USSR Academy of Sciences.

The main works of Efroimson were devoted to the broader area of genetics including: the effects of ionizing radiation, mechanism of carcinogenesis and radiation sickness, mechanism of immunity, neuropsychiatric genetics, genetics of human pathologies, etc. He wrote the first Russian monograph on genetics, The Introduction to Medical Genetics (1964)--the book that triggered the revival of human genetics in the Soviet Union. He was the author of three monographs and over 100 scientific papers and the editor of many books on different issues of genetics. The last years he worked on the genetics of social behavior. With onset of perestroyka his results in this areas were posthumously published in three books: Genetics of Geniality, Pedagogical Genetics (1998) and Genetics of Ethics and Aesthetic (1995). He is the author of many philosophical works including his Origin of Altruism (Novy Mir, 1971). Efroimson entered the annals of Russian science as an outstanding researcher, but also as an unblinking fighter for the truth, an uncompromising opponent of anti-scientific directions in biology, an ardent advocate of genetics and the moral standard of a true scientist.

Efoimson married Maria Grigorievna Tsubina (1906-1976) in 1938 and became a step-father to her daughter. He had no children of his own.

Vladimir Efroimson is a prototype of Ilya Goldberg, one of the protagonists in the Lyudmila Ulitskaya's novel Kukotsky's Case (Booker-Open Russia Literary Prize, 2001)

Russian-American poet Vladimir Efroimson (poet) is his nephew.

== Other sources ==
- Korochkin, L I; Iziumova E A (1989). "Vladimir Pavlovich Efroimson (21 November 1908-21 July 1989)". Ontogenez. 20 (6). USSR: 667–8. ISSN 0475-1450. PMID 2694043.
- "Vladimir Pavlovich Efroimson (on his 70th birthday)". Genetika. 14 (12). USSR: 2223–4. 1978. ISSN 0016-6758. PMID 369948.
