= Alexander Serebrovsky (geneticist) =

Soviet geneticist, poultry breeder, and eugenicist (1892–1948)

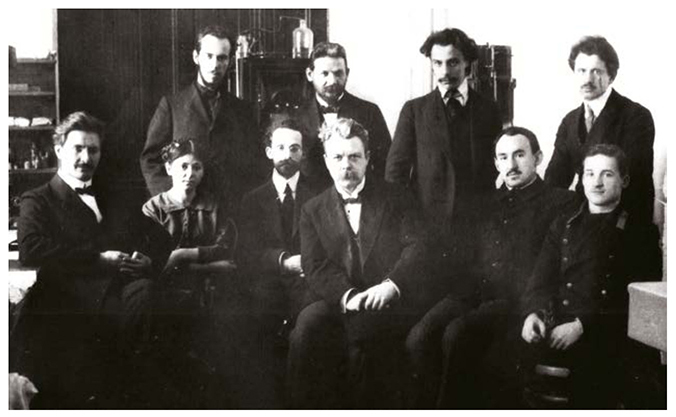
- Nikolai Koltsov with students c. 1913. Serebrovsky standing at far left
- Born: Alexander Sergeyevich Serebrovsky; 18 February 1892; Kursk, Russian Empire
- Died: 26 June 1948 (aged 56); Bolshevo, Moscow Oblast, RSFSR, Soviet Union
- Occupation: Geneticist

Alexander Sergeyevich Serebrovsky (Russian: Александр Сергеевич Серебровский; 18 February 1892 – 26 June 1948) was a Russian geneticist, poultry breeder, and eugenicist. He was among the founding figures of genetics within the early days of the Soviet Union and held a high status within the communist party but when Soviet genetics entered a power struggle, he was targeted for his ideas in eugenics which led to the sidelining of his career although he was not executed like several other geneticists during the purges under Stalin. Serebrovsky is credited with defining the term genofond from which the English term gene pool is derived. He was also the pioneer of the theory on which the sterile male technique of pest management is based.

== Life and work ==
Serebrovsky was born in Kursk in a well-connected family. His father Sergei Mitrofanovich had trained in art and was an architect in Kursk while his mother Yuliya Dmitriyevna was from Livny. The family were friends of A.A. Bogdanov and A.V. Lunacharsky. Alexander studied at the Tula Realschule and then went to study at Moscow University, graduating in 1914. He then studied at the Shaniavsky Free Public University under Nikolai Koltsov. He was conscripted in World War I and fought on the Caucasus front in 1916 and after demobilization he worked briefly at the zoo and then worked in a poultry breeding station in Slobodka near Tula. After Koltsov rose in position and founded the Institute of Experimental Biology in 1917, his patronage helped Serebrovsky to study poultry genetics from around 1918. He took special interest in the conservation of the Orloff and Pavlov breeds of chicken. His research station was the Anikovo Genetics Station of Narkomzem in Zvenigorod uezd about 60 km from Moscow and he headed the station from 1921 to 1923. From 1923 to 1930 he taught at the Moscow Zootechnical Institute while also collaborating with other Moscow geneticists like S.S. Chetverikov. Serebrovsky also worked with S.G. Navashin at the Timiryazev Biological Institute where he helped develop a laboratory in 1929 where he developed the idea of "step-allelomorphism" (or "step-alleles", pseudo alleles that represent closely located loci on a chromosome that act as a single module.) In 1926 he also suggested the need for a synthesis of Darwinism and genetics. He was responsible for a shift in Solomon Levit from Lamarckism to Mendelism.

In 1929 Serebrovsky wrote a book Anthropogenetics and Eugenics in a Socialist Society (Антропогенетика и евгеника в социалистическом обществе) in which he suggested that the use of artificial insemination with sperm obtained from carefully chosen men would help society under socialism unlike the negative eugenics that the western world considered. He suggested that true socialism would involve the separation of love and reproduction. This, and his support for inheritance of characters, along with a rejection of Lamarckism, were to lead to his downfall.

One of Serebrovsky's students was Nikolay Dubinin who rose rapidly in political power. Despite an attempt to repent for his mistakes, Serebrovsky came under attack in the 1930s from several quarters including Dubinin. He was castigated for "Menshevizing idealism." Serebrovsky, Koltsov, and Filipchenko were targeted as eugenicists with fascist ideology. These matters were made worse when Hermann Muller wrote his book on eugenics and sent them to Stalin. Dubinin was keen to prevent the perversion of science by the "scum of ideas of Lotsy, DeVries, Morgan, Serebrovsky, Filipchencko, and others." Serebrovsky fired Dubinin from the institute and Serebrovsky's laboratory was closed in 1932. Dubinin and Lysenko both targeted Koltsov and this led to Koltsov being removed from his institute and possibly assassinated. Serebrovsky clashed with Trofim Lysenko calling him mrakobes, an expletive meaning ("obscurantist") at meetings in 1935 and 1936. Lysenko claimed that racism and fascism were part of the philosophy of genetics.

Serebrovsky became a recluse and in 1938 published a theoretical study on the idea of releasing into wild insect pest populations individuals possessing specific chromosomal rearrangements with the aim of reducing the size of the pest population. This kind of approach is now referred to as a type of suppression gene drive. This study was published in 1940, but several of his works remained unpublished. He died at a sanatorium in Moscow.
