= Aleksandr Formozov =

Russian scientist (1899–1973)

- Born: Aleksandr Nikolaevich Formozov; February 13, 1899; Nizhny Novgorod
- Died: December 22, 1973 (aged 74); Moscow
- Citizenship: Russian Empire, USSR
- Education: Moscow State University

Aleksandr Nikolaevich Formozov (1899–1973) was a Soviet biologist and environmentalist. He studied the biogeography and ecology of the steppe regions and is best known for his work on snow cover in ecology.

== Biography ==
Alexander Formozov was born in Nizhny Novgorod to Nikolai Yelpidiforovich Formozov (1871–1928) and Elizabeth Fedorovna née Fedorova. His father worked in the local institutions, contributed to newspapers and was a keen hunter. Alexander's early studies were at the local Gymnasium after which he moved to study chemistry at the Warsaw Polytechnic Institute. In 1919 he joined the Red Army and fought on the Southern Front. He later moved to study biology and then graduated in natural sciences from Moscow State University in 1925. He went on an expedition to Mongolia and the Far East organized by the USSR Academy of Sciences. He became an associate professor in 1929 at Leningrad and a full professor from 1935. He headed the Research Institute of Poultry and Poultry industry from 1931 and an institute for fur and hunting.

He worked on aspects of biogeography from 1962. From 1945 Formozov centred his research on the ecology of the steppes and deserts found in the Soviet Union. Formozov introduced numerous terms for snow drift phenomena that precisely identify habitats and associations.

He married twice, first to Lyubov Nikolaevna née Promptova (1903–1990) sister of the ornithologist Aleksandr Promptov. They had a son Aleksandr Aleksandrovich Formozov (1928–2009), who was a prominent archeologist. His second wife was Varvara Ivanovna Osmolovskaya (1916–1994) with whom he had two children.
