= Zhores Medvedev =

Russian dissident, biologist, and historian (1925–2018)

- Жорес Медведев
- Born: Zhores Aleksandrovich Medvedev; 14 November 1925; Tbilisi, Transcaucasian SFSR, USSR
- Died: 15 November 2018 (aged 93); London, England
- Education: Russian State Agricultural University
- Known for: Human rights activism and participation in dissident movement in the Soviet Union
- Scientific career
- Fields: Agronomy, biology, gerontology

Zhores Aleksandrovich Medvedev (Russian: Жоре́с Алекса́ндрович Медве́дев; 14 November 1925 – 15 November 2018) was a Russian agronomist, biologist, historian and dissident. His twin brother is the historian Roy Medvedev.

== Biography ==
=== Early life and education ===
Zhores Medvedev and his twin brother Roy were born on 14 November 1925 in Tbilisi, Transcaucasian SFSR, USSR. Their mother Yulia (nee Reiman), was a cellist, and their father, Alexander Medvedev, was a philosopher in a military academy in Leningrad. Zhores, named after French socialist leader Jean Jaurès (his twin was named after Indian revolutionary M. N. Roy), was drafted into the Red Army in 1943, but was soon discharged after being seriously wounded in a battle on the Taman Peninsula. He then began his studies in biology at the Timiryazev Agricultural Academy in Moscow. In December 1950, Zhores was awarded a PhD degree for his research into sexual processes in plants.

=== Biology research in the USSR ===
He became a junior research scientist in the Agrochemistry and Biochemistry Department at Timiryazev Academy and he was promoted to senior research scientist in 1954 and remained at the academy until 1963. Beginning in 1952, Medvedev had focused his attention on the problems of aging, concentrating on the turnover of proteins and nucleic acids. In 1961, he published the first paper suggesting that aging is the result of an accumulation of errors in the synthesis of proteins and nucleic acids. In 1962, Medvedev wrote his book on the history of Soviet genetics, which passed an editorial review but was withheld by state censors. It was later published in the United States in 1969 as The Rise and Fall of T.D. Lysenko.

In 1963, Medvedev moved to Obninsk to the Institute of Medical Radiology, where he was appointed head of the molecular radiobiology laboratory. He published two books, Protein Biosynthesis and Problems of Heredity Development and Ageing (Note: 1963; English translation 1965 Oliver and Boyd, Edinburgh) and Molecular Mechanisms of Development. (Note: 1966; English translation 1968, Plenum Press, New York)

==== Dissident writings ====
Medvedev was dismissed from his position in 1969. Between 1968 and 1970, Medvedev wrote two more books: International Cooperation of Scientists and National Frontiers and Secrecy of Correspondence is Guaranteed by Law (about postal censorship in the USSR). These works were widely circulated in the USSR among scientists, along with a copy of his 1962 history of Soviet genetics (which had been published in Grani, a Russian journal published outside the USSR), and this activity resulted in Medvedev's arrest and forced detention in the Kaluga psychiatric hospital in May 1970. This action, however, produced many protests from scientists (academics Andrei Sakharov, Pyotr Kapitsa, Igor Tamm, Vladimir Engelgardt, Boris Astaurov, Nikolai Semyonov, and others) and writers (including Solzhenitsyn, Tvardovsky, Vladimir Tendryakov, Vladimir Dudintsev), which resulted in Medvedev's release (this experience was reflected in Zhores and Roy Medvedev's book A Question of Madness (Note: Macmillan in London in 1971)).

In 1971, Medvedev was given the job of senior scientist of the Institute of Physiology and Biochemistry of Farm Animals in Borovsk, in the Kaluga region.

=== London ===
In 1972, Medvedev was invited for one year's research by the National Institute for Medical Research in London at its new Genetic Division. In August 1973, however, his Soviet passport was confiscated and he was stripped of his Soviet citizenship. He remained in London and worked as senior research scientist at the National Institute for Medical Research until his retirement in 1991.

==== Publication of information about the Kyshtym disaster ====
In 1977, Medvedev published Hazards of Nuclear Power, which mentioned the Kyshtym nuclear disaster in passing. At the time, the disaster was essentially unknown, and his work was dismissed as baseless propaganda even by his Western colleagues. Medvedev responded by publishing Soviet Science in 1978, which assembled evidence from Soviet publications that taken together comprised conclusive evidence of the disaster's occurrence. He followed this with the book The Nuclear Disaster in the Urals in 1979, and a further critique The Legacy of Chernobyl (1990), which connected the two disasters as being a product of the same attitudes toward science and engineering in the USSR.

==== Further work ====
In London, Medvedev acted as his brother Roy's representative, managing his publishing contracts and financial affairs. In 1975 he created a small publishing house, "T.C.D. publications", for the purpose of publishing the Russian-language version of Roy Medvedev's samizdat journal XX Century. The two brothers also coauthored Khrushchev: The Years in Power (1978) and several other books, the last one The Unknown Stalin (2007).

Medvedev died in London on 15 November 2018, one day after his 93rd birthday, with his family by his side. In 2019, his memoirs posthumously appeared in Russian under the title A Dangerous Profession.

== Legacy ==
Medvedev published about 170 research papers and reviews, about sixty of them during his time in London. In 1973 he was one of the signatories of the Humanist Manifesto. He received the Aging Research Award from the United States Association of Biogerontology in 1984 and the Rene Schubert Prize in Gerontology in 1985.

According to Michael Gordin, a professor of history at Princeton University, Medvedev provided critiques of the Soviet Union that were "powerful, persuasive and principled", with Medvedev being "sympathetic to the dreams of the [Russian] Revolution" but opposed to the "cronyism and Stalinism [that] had contaminated the early promise."

== Works ==
- Protein Biosynthesis and Problems of Heredity, Development and Ageing. New York: Plenum Press, 1966. Edinburgh: Oliver and Boyd Ltd, 1966
- Unknown Stalin: His Life, Death, and Legacy (with Roy Medvedev, Ellen Dahrendorf - Translator) (Overlook Press, 2005), ISBN 1-58567-644-6
- Legacy of Chernobyl (W. W. Norton & Co Inc, 1992), ISBN 0-393-30814-6
- Soviet Agriculture (W. W. Norton & Co Inc, 1988), ISBN 0-393-02472-5
- Gorbachev (W. W. Norton & Co Inc, 1987), ISBN 0-393-30408-6
- Andropov (W. W. Norton & Co Inc, 1983), ISBN 0-393-01791-5
- Nuclear Disaster in the Urals (1980), ISBN 0-394-74445-4
- Gorbachev (1986), ISBN 0-631-14782-9
- Molecular-Genetic Mechanisms of Development (1970), ISBN 0-306-30403-1
- Medvedev Papers: Fruitful Meetings between Scientists of the World (1971), ISBN 0-333-12520-7
- Ten Years after Ivan Denisovich (1974), ISBN 0-394-71112-2
- Hazards of Nuclear Power (with Alan Roberts) (1977), ISBN 0-85124-211-1
- Secrecy of Correspondence Is Guaranteed by Law (1975), ISBN 0-85124-128-X
- Soviet Science (1978), ISBN 0-393-06435-2
- Stalin and the Jewish Question: New Analysis (2003, in Russian), ISBN 5-7712-0251-7
- Solzhenitsyn and Sakharov: Two Prophets (with Roy Medvedev) (2004, in Russian) ISBN 5-94117-065-3
- The Rise and Fall of T. D. Lysenko (translated by I. Michael. Lerner) Columbia University Press (1969), ISBN 0-231-03183-1
- Medvedev Papers: The Plight Of Soviet Science, ISBN 3-331-25207-7
- A Question Of Madness (with Roy Medvedev), ISBN 0-14-003783-7
- Nuclear Disaster In The Urals (trans. George Saunders), ISBN 0-207-95896-3
- Khrushchev: The Years In Power (with Roy Medvedev), ISBN 0-8357-0154-9
- National Frontiers / International Scientific Cooperation (Medvedev Papers), Spokesman Books, 1975, ISBN 0-85124-127-1
- Nutrition and Longevity (2011, in Russian), publ. "Vremya" Moscow, ISBN 978-5-9691-0513-3
- Nutrition and Longevity (in Russian), 2007, ISBN 978-5-7712-0380-5
- Polonium in London (in Russian), 2008, Molodaya Gvardia, Moscow:ISBN 978-5-235-03160-9

== Articles ==
- Medvedev, Zhores (May 1994). "Abroad". Challenge. 37 (3): 61–64. doi:10.1080/05775132.1994.11471749.
- Medvedev, Zhores (26 January 1987). "Andrei Sakharov's return ..." The Scientist.
- Medvedev, Zhores (October 1994). "Chernobyl: eight years after". Trends in Ecology and Evolution. 9 (10): 369–371. Bibcode:1994TEcoE...9..369M. doi:10.1016/0169-5347(94)90055-8. PMID 21236894.
- Medvedev, Zhores (September–October 1979). "Russia under Brezhnev". New Left Review. I (117): 3–29.
- Medvedev, Zhores (9 January 1986). "Sakharov's scientific legacy". Nature. 319 (6049): 93. Bibcode:1986Natur.319Q..93M. doi:10.1038/319093a0. S2CID 4337731.
- Medvedev, Zhores (July 1976). "Since Khrushchev". Soviet Studies. 28 (3): 430–433. doi:10.1080/09668137608411077.
- Medvedev, Zhores (28 July 1977). "Soviet genetics: new controversy". Nature. 268 (5618): 285–287. Bibcode:1977Natur.268..285M. doi:10.1038/268285a0.
- Medvedev, Zhores (March 1991). "Technological glasnost". Nature. 350 (6316): 283. Bibcode:1991Natur.350..283M. doi:10.1038/350283a0.
- Medvedev, Zhores (21 February 1976). "The defeat of Russian dissent". The Spectator: 8–9.
- Medvedev, Zhores (March 1990). "The legacy of Andrei Sakharov". Index on Censorship. 19 (3): 13–14. doi:10.1080/03064229008534808.
- Medvedev, Zhores (4 November 1976). "Two decades off dissidence". New Scientist. 72 (1025): 264–267.
- Medvedev, Roy; Medvedev, Zhores (1976). "Krushchev's secret speech". Australian Left Review. 1 (52): 34–37. Archived from the original on 2016-06-23.
- Articles on poisoning of Alexander Litvinenko.
  - Medvedev, Zhores (2007). Polonium-210 in London (A5). Vol. 96 (Legacies of Harm). Bertrand Russell Peace Foundation. p. 100. ISBN 978-0-85124-747-2.
  - Coates, Ken; Chomsky, Noam; Medvedev, Zhores A. (2007). Coates, Ken (ed.). Legacies of Harm. Coronet Books Inc. p. 96. ISBN 978-0-85124-747-2.
