= Dmitriy Filatov =

Russian embryologist (1876–1943)

Dmitriy Petrovich Filatov (Russian: Дмитрий Петрович Филатов; January 31, 1876 – January 18, 1943), born in the village of Tyoply Stan (now Sechenovo), Nizhny Novgorod Oblast, was a Russian and Soviet embryologist.

== Biography ==
Dmitriy Filatov’s father, Petr Mikhailovich Filatov, was a wealthy landowner who married late in life. His mother, Klavdiya Vasilevna Kazakova, came from the serf peasantry. Among his relatives included mathematicians, zoologists, ophthalmologists, and pediatricians. His childhood home was frequented by physiologist Ivan Sechenov, who would conduct experiments on the frogs surrounding the Filatov home.

In 1894 he finished school in his home region and entered the law faculty at Saint Petersburg University, later transferring to the Department of Natural Sciences at Imperial Moscow University (now Moscow State University), where he graduated in 1900.

Participation in student unrest led to a short prison sentence, and in 1901 Dmitriy Filatov entered medical school but left a year later without finishing. From 1902 to 1906 he worked as an assistant at the Institute of Comparative Anatomy attached to Imperial Moscow University.

He left to travel in Germany in 1907, and in 1908 took part in an expedition organized by renowned zoologist Boris Zhitkov to the Yamal Peninsula, a remote region in Siberia’s far north. There he was responsible for collecting samples of flora and fauna.

From 1907 to 1919 Dmitriy Filatov served as a zoological assistant first at the Moscow Agricultural Institute (now Moscow State Agrarian University) and then at the Moscow Commercial Institute (now Plekhanov Russian University of Economics). He later returned to the Institute of Comparative Anatomy as an assistant to Aleksey Cevertsov, a founder of animal evolutionary morphology.

From there he returned to academia, passing his master’s examinations in 1914 and serving as an assistant professor at the now-renamed Moscow State University (MSU) starting in 1919. From 1922 to 1925 he was a senior researcher at the hydrobiological station at Deep Lake (Moscow Oblast), and from 1924 to 1937 was head of the Subdepartment of Developmental Mechanics at the People’s Commissariat of Health’s Institute of Experimental Biology (later the Institute of Cytology, Histology and Embryology of the Academy of Sciences of the Soviet Union).

From 1931 to 1941 Dmitriy Filatov headed the Department of Embryonic Morphology Mechanics at MSU’s Institute of Experimental Morphology, and from 1936 was a full professor at the university. He became head of Moscow State University’s Subdepartment of Embryology in 1940, the first such department in the country.

At this point he has already long studied embryology, using various expeditions to further his research from his days as a student. He researched the Northern Fur Seal on the Commander Islands (1913–1914), the Caucasian Bison (1909–1911) and the fish of the Aral Sea (1921–1922).

In 1916 he conducted pioneering work the inductive action exerted on the embryonic mesenchyme by the auditory vesicle during the auditory capsule’s formation. This effectively launched the start of experimental embryology in the Soviet Union. He also conducted research on the development of the eye (1925–1936) and on the differentiation of limbs (1927–1932). The main focus of his research was to derive, by experimental study, the laws of individual development in the embryo, as well as the evolution of formative interactions during gestation.

Dmitriy Filatov’s discoveries include the dependent development of certain mesenchymal skull buds, the importance of limb bud volume for triggering differentiation, the nonspecificity of the first stages of extremity development and the peculiarities of certain species during lens formation. The core of his theoretical studies was determination analysis and the complexity of the shaping process.

While Dmitriy Filatov had no direct predecessors, he was greatly influenced by Petr Sushkin and Nikolai Koltsov. He went to become perhaps the most prominent Russian embryologist of his day
