= Slobodka, Tarnogsky District, Vologda Oblast =

Slobodka Слободка
- Village
- Location within Vologda Oblast Location within Russia
- Coordinates: 60°24′16″N 43°56′00″E
- Country: Russia
- Region: Vologda Oblast
- District: Tarnogsky District
- Time zone: UTC+3:00

Slobodka (Russian: Слободка) is a rural locality (a village) in Markushevskoye Rural Settlement, Tarnogsky District, Vologda Oblast, Russia. The population was 22 as of 2002.

== Geography ==
Slobodka is located 24 km southeast of Tarnogsky Gorodok (the district's administrative centre) by road. Shevelevskaya is the nearest rural locality.
