= Slobodka, Parfenovsky Selsoviet, Velikoustyugsky District, Vologda Oblast =

Slobodka Слободка
- Village
- Location within Vologda Oblast Location within Russia
- Coordinates: 60°33′N 46°31′E
- Country: Russia
- Region: Vologda Oblast
- District: Velikoustyugsky District
- Time zone: UTC+3:00

Slobodka (Russian: Слободка) is a rural locality (a village) in Parfyonovskoye Rural Settlement, Velikoustyugsky District, Vologda Oblast, Russia. The population was 4 as of 2002.

== Geography ==
The distance to Veliky Ustyug is 31.5 km, to Karasovo is 20 km. Medvezhy Vzvoz is the nearest rural locality.
