= Slobodka, Nyuksensky District, Vologda Oblast =

Slobodka Слободка
- Village
- Location within Vologda Oblast Location within Russia
- Coordinates: 60°11′N 44°23′E
- Country: Russia
- Region: Vologda Oblast
- District: Nyuksensky District
- Time zone: UTC+3:00

Slobodka (Russian: Слободка) is a rural locality (a village) in Gorodishchenskoye Rural Settlement, Nyuksensky District, Vologda Oblast, Russia. The population was 13 as of 2002.

== Geography ==
Slobodka is located 43 km southeast of Nyuksenitsa (the district's administrative centre) by road. Lukino is the nearest rural locality.
