= Slobodka, Rodnikovsky District, Ivanovo Oblast =

Slobodka Слободка
- Village
- Location within Ivanovo Oblast Location within Russia
- Coordinates: 57°05′N 41°55′E
- Country: Russia
- Region: Ivanovo Oblast
- District: Rodnikovsky District
- Time zone: UTC+3:00

Slobodka (Russian: Слободка) is a rural locality (a village) in Rodnikovsky District, Ivanovo Oblast, Russia. Population: 11 (2010 census);

== Geography ==
This rural locality is located 12 kilometres (7.5 mi) from Rodniki (the district's administrative centre), 59 kilometres (37 mi) from Ivanovo (capital of Ivanovo Oblast) and 300 kilometres (190 mi) from Moscow. Filisovo is the nearest rural locality.
