= Slobodka, Mezhdurechensky District, Vologda Oblast =

Slobodka Слободка
- Village
- Location within Vologda Oblast Location within Russia
- Coordinates: 59°26′N 41°34′E
- Country: Russia
- Region: Vologda Oblast
- District: Mezhdurechensky District
- Time zone: UTC+3:00

Slobodka (Russian: Слободка) is a rural locality (a village) in Turovetskoye Rural Settlement, Mezhdurechensky District, Vologda Oblast, Russia. The population was 11 as of 2002.

== Geography ==
Slobodka is located 254 km northeast of Shuyskoye (the district's administrative centre) by road. Golubi is the nearest rural locality.
