= Slobodka, Kichmengsko-Gorodetsky District, Vologda Oblast =

Slobodka Слободка
- Selo
- Location within Vologda Oblast Location within Russia
- Coordinates: 59°58′N 46°14′E
- Country: Russia
- Region: Vologda Oblast
- District: Kichmengsko-Gorodetsky District
- Time zone: UTC+3:00

Slobodka (Russian: Слободка) is a rural locality (a selo) in Yenangskoye Rural Settlement, Kichmengsko-Gorodetsky District, Vologda Oblast, Russia. The population was 64 as of 2002.

== Geography ==
Slobodka is located 41 km east of Kichmengsky Gorodok (the district's administrative centre) by road. Rybino is the nearest rural locality.
