= Genetics of social behavior =

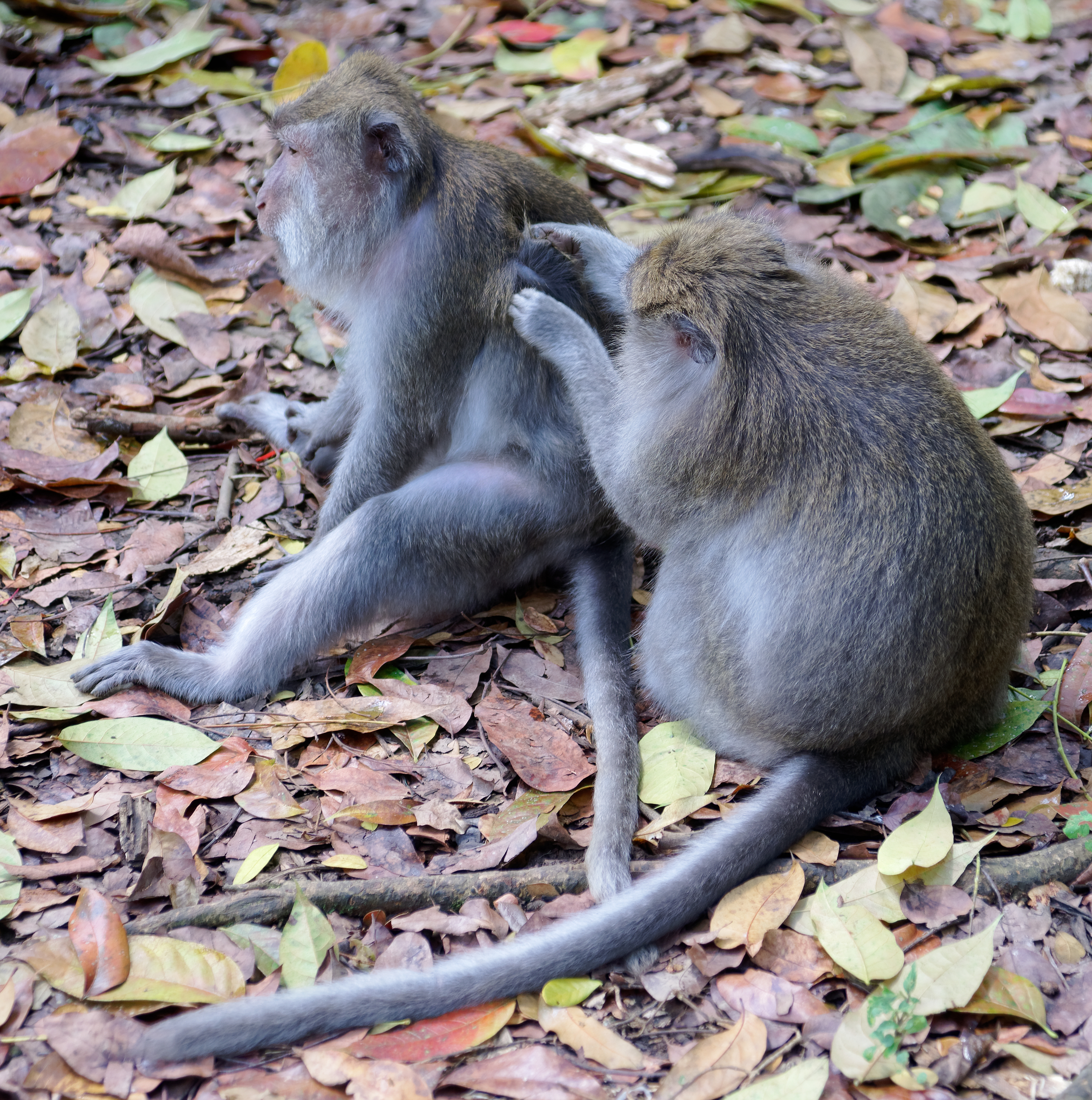
Crab-eating macaques participating in social grooming.

The genetics of social behavior is an area of research that attempts to address the question of the role that genes play in modulating the neural circuits in the brain which influence social behavior. Model genetic species, such as Drosophila melanogaster (common fruit fly) and Apis mellifera (honey bee), have been rigorously studied and proven to be instrumental in developing the science of genetics. Many examples of genetic factors of social behavior have been derived from a bottom-up method of altering a gene and observing the change it produces in an organism. Sociogenomics is an integrated field that accounts for the complete cellular genetic complement of an organism from a top-down approach, accounting for all biotic influences that effect behavior on a cellular level.

== Sociogenomics ==
Sociogenomics, a subdiscipline of genomics, is an integrative approach to behavioral biology that compares genomic data to behavioral phenotype. Of particular interest are differential gene expression of mRNA (transcriptomics) and protein transcription (proteomics) that correspond to changes in behavior. Data of this sort is especially useful when comparing the genomic qualities of organisms with varying degrees of social organization.

While sociogenomics integrates more fields of study and is more encompassing than classical genetics, the methodology is still considered forward genetics. The goal is to determine genes or sets of genes and their artifacts that contribute to the expression of a phenotype.

=== Eusociality ===
Sociogenomic methodology has been applied to understanding the biology of eusociality include its cellular origin, caste determination in a eusocial hierarchy, and the mechanisms that mediate division of labor. Efforts in genome sequencing have allowed researchers to examine eusocial insect behavior from a molecular perspective.

Notable progress in this field was made by the Honey Bee Genome Sequencing Consortium, led by Gene E. Robinson, which published and made public a completed honey bee (Apis mellifera) genome in October 2006. Completion of the honey bee genome and other model organism genomes has made further between-species sociogenomic comparisons possible.

==== Honey bee ====
To examine higher insect social order, researchers looked into the potential evolutionary history of a "foraging gene" in honey bees (Apis mellifera). Honey bees have a several week lifespan divided between two phases—one spent caring for the hive, the other spent foraging. The regulation of social foraging is important to maintain division of labor, requisite of eusocial organization. In order to discover how foraging in bees is genetically encoded, the honey bee genome was searched for genes that may be shared by other species. A molecular basis for feeding behavior has been determined in Drosophila melanogaster, which shares a common insect ancestor. The "foraging gene" in D. melanogaster encodes a cGMP mediated protein kinase (PKG). Naturally occurring allelic variation produces behavioral syndromes in D. melanogaster, both "sitters" and "rovers". The needs of a honey bee colony are communicated between bees by pheromones, chemical signals which trigger behavioral responses. Honey bees have a variant of the same foraging gene that controls the onset of foraging behavior. Elevated expression of this gene correlates with increased foraging activity; precocious foraging was induced in young workers by experimentally introducing PKG.

Further clues to the genetic origins of eusociality have been derived by comparing quality of genomic processes. Also applying to A. mellifera; by looking at the degree of genetic linkage and chromosomal recombination rates, light may be shed on the consequence of group selection on a eusocial insect colony. Within the Order Hymenoptera, primitively and highly eusocial species tend to have greater gene linkage and significantly higher more DNA recombination events than non-social species. This trend continues within groups of eusocial species, highly eusocial species have highly recombinant genomes. While contested, recombination activity might originate from the influence of group selection acting on developing eusocial organization in haplodiploids, where colonies that can best maintain a stable coefficient of relatedness are favored.

An early study also determined the cellular basis of the discrete caste morphology of A. mellifera. Queens arise when workers in a colony selectively feed chosen larvae royal jelly. The caste differentiation occurs through an epigenetic process; non-heritable factors contributing to gene expression. Queen and worker morphological forms both come occur from the same genome, royal jelly nourishment is the non-genetic determiner. The pathway to queen morphs is through increased mRNA translation in the cytosol. Biogenesis of organelles occurs at the same rate in both types of larvae, as evidenced by the ratio of mitochondrial DNA to nuclear DNA. Special feeding leads to an increase of metabolic rate for larval queen to facilitate the energy requirement to develop their larger body size.

== Social influences on gene expression ==
In songbirds, egr1 is a transcription factor encoding gene that is active in the auditory forebrain when hearing a song from another songbird. The strength of the expression of egr1 has much variability, dependent on the nature of the song. Songs previously unheard result in strong responses whereas familiar songs result in little or no response. Pure tones or white noise do not evoke any response. It is thought that the purpose of this genetic response to social stimuli is to update the brain's catalog of the changing natural environment. For example, it would be advantageous for a songbird to express more egr1 in a situation where there is a new song heard (a potential intruder) compared to the familiar song of a known individual. In contrast, for the species of highly social cichlid fish A. burtoni, the egr1 gene plays an indirect role in reproduction. In this species, there is an established social dominance hierarchy and an individual's position determines their access to resources for reproduction. If the alpha male is removed from the group, a previous subordinate starts exhibiting dominant behavior and egr1 is expressed in hypothalamus neurons that are responsible for producing a neuropeptide linked to sexual reproduction. Overall, the role of transcription factor egr1 in the context of social behavior clearly shows the link between genes and behavior. As a corollary to that described above, given an environmental cue egr1 will induce or suppress the transcription of other genes. Egr1 shows how social experience may trigger changes in the brain's gene networks. With higher capacity screening techniques, the expression of many genes simultaneously in response to social stimuli will provide a more complete picture.

== Neurobiology of mating decisions ==
The neurobiology of drosophila mating behavior is an area of research that has studied in detail and has elucidated the genetic basis for behavior. The male courts a female based on pheromones from the female and previous experience courting other potential mates. The female accepts or rejects the male's courtship also based on pheromones, the acoustics of his courtship song, and her readiness to mate. The mating behavior of drosophila had been described almost a century ago, and the genetics of these behaviors have been studied for several decades. The current interest in neurobiology is trying to understand the neural circuits that provide the basis of action selection—how the brain maps sensory input, internal states, and individual experience to behavioral decisions.

The pathways that govern the mapping of pheromones to the brain of drosophila are beginning to be understood in detail. Pheromones are detected by olfactory sensory neurons (OSNs). A well-studied pheromone is cVA, which suppresses male courtship behavior when the male detects it from a female. cVA complexes with other proteins to form a ligand, which binds to the odorant receptor Or67d present in OSNs, which is specific for cVA. In turn, the OSNs grow axons that will connect to the glomerulus DA1 in the antennal lobe, which is analogous to the olfactory bulb in mammals. This glomerulus then connects to DA1 projection neurons (PNs) which relay the pheromone signal further to higher brain centers in the protocerebrum (anterior part of an arthropod brain). It is noteworthy that there is significant neuronal convergence taking place between the OSNs and PNs—about 50 OSN inputs to 4 PNs.

Another pathway that has been studied is that involving another odorant receptor called Or47b, which is connected to the VA1v glomerulus. Its respective pathway conveys pheromones from odors in both sexes, and when the genetics of the involved neurons is changed, male courtship is delayed. As a simple model, one would view the integration of the Or67d/DA1 and Or47b/VA1v pathways as a way to describe the initiation of mating behavior in drosophila. The former will tend to inhibit male courtship, whereas the latter is thought to stimulate mating.

It is thought that the difference in the fru gene causes the bulk of the distinction in sexual differentiation in neural circuits. Although the sensory and motor circuits are nearly identical in both sexes, the fru gene fine tunes these according to the needs of either sex. There is learning taking place when a male engages in courtship behavior. A male learns by experience, after courtship rejection by females that have already mated he learns not to pursue other mated females. Similarly, courtship of receptive virgin females is learned after past mating successes. The mushroom bodies are a probable site for this experience-dependent modulation of pheromones, as disrupting fru in neurons in this area reduces short term courtship behavior. Long term courtship is suppressed by the presence of certain proteins in this region of the brain.

For females, the decision whether to mate or not when courted by a male largely depends on the courtship song. Analogous to OSNs, the female's Johnston's organ neurons (JONs) distinguish the quality of the song, and a distinct mechanical stimuli projects signals to specific regions of the brain, which can lead to mating. The reluctance for a female to mate again after having mated before has a molecular basis. In the male Drosophila ejaculate, there is a sex peptide (SP) which binds to the sex peptide receptor (SRP) in the female's fru neurons, disrupting pathways that would compel the female to mate again.

Future research in this area hopes to further explain how the chemical and auditory signals are processed and mapped to behaviors in the fly's brain. Though the molecular mechanisms in the pathways vary between mammals and insects, it has been shown that the information is processed in similar ways. The relative simplicity of fly nervous systems could eventually hint at how neural circuits solve complex behavioral decision making.

== Effects of oxytocin and vasopressin on animal behavior ==
In the past few decades, it has been discovered that oxytocin and vasopressin neuropeptides have key roles in the regulation of social cognition and behavior in mammals. Although homologs have been discovered which are pervasive across many taxa which have similar roles in social and reproductive behaviors, the specific influenced behaviors are quite diverse. For example, in snails the homolog for oxytocin/vasopressin conopressin modulates ejaculation in males and egg laying in females. On the other hand, for vertebrates there is sexual dimorphism in the neuropeptides—oxytocin induces maternal behavior in females and vasopressin induces territoriality, aggression and reproduction in males. In sheep, oxytocin has another effect on a female in addition to a generalized increase in maternal behavior—it induces mother-infant bond selectivity by priming the mother's olfactory bulb, and the mother selectively learns the offspring's scent.

An insightful study of vasopressin is its role in the stimulation of monogamous behavior. The V1a vasopressin receptor gene is a mechanism most widely studied. Different species of voles were studied, prairie voles which are monogamous in nature and montane voles, which tend towards polygamy. Using viral vector mediated gene expression, which allows the cross-species transplanting of genes, when the V1a receptor expression was increased in the reward and reinforcement neural circuitry of montane voles, they acquired a more selective preference for their mate. Their behavior became more akin to that of prairie voles. Therefore, it is alteration of vasopressin receptor gene expression patterns is thought to affect social behavior, rather than the neuropeptide itself. A proposed mechanism for the difference in these patterns is the variation of microsatellite DNA length that is upstream of the V1a receptor gene—short microsatellite DNA in the 5' flanking region of the gene has a different effect on prairie vole behavior than longer microsatellite DNA. Whether this is a mechanism that is replicable in the wild is uncertain.
