= Slobodka, Kirzhachsky District, Vladimir Oblast =

Slobodka Слободка
- Village
- Location within Vladimir Oblast Location within Russia
- Coordinates: 56°16′N 38°55′E
- Country: Russia
- Region: Vladimir Oblast
- District: Kirzhachsky District
- Time zone: UTC+3:00

Slobodka (Russian: Слободка) is a rural locality (a village) in Gorkinskoye Rural Settlement, Kirzhachsky District, Vladimir Oblast, Russia. The population was 17 as of 2010. There are 4 streets.

== Geography ==
Slobodka is located 18 km north of Kirzhach (the district's administrative centre) by road. Bardovo is the nearest rural locality.
