= Slobodka, Vyaznikovsky District, Vladimir Oblast =

Slobodka Слободка
- Village
- Location within Vladimir Oblast Location within Russia
- Coordinates: 56°21′N 41°57′E
- Country: Russia
- Region: Vladimir Oblast
- District: Vyaznikovsky District
- Time zone: UTC+3:00

Slobodka (Russian: Слободка) is a rural locality (a village) in Mstyora Urban Settlement, Vyaznikovsky District, Vladimir Oblast, Russia. The population was 69 as of 2010.

== Geography ==
Slobodka is located 21 km northwest of Vyazniki (the district's administrative centre) by road. Novosyolka is the nearest rural locality.
