= Lake Maloye Miassovo =

Lake in Chelyabinsk Oblast, Russia

Maloye Miassovo
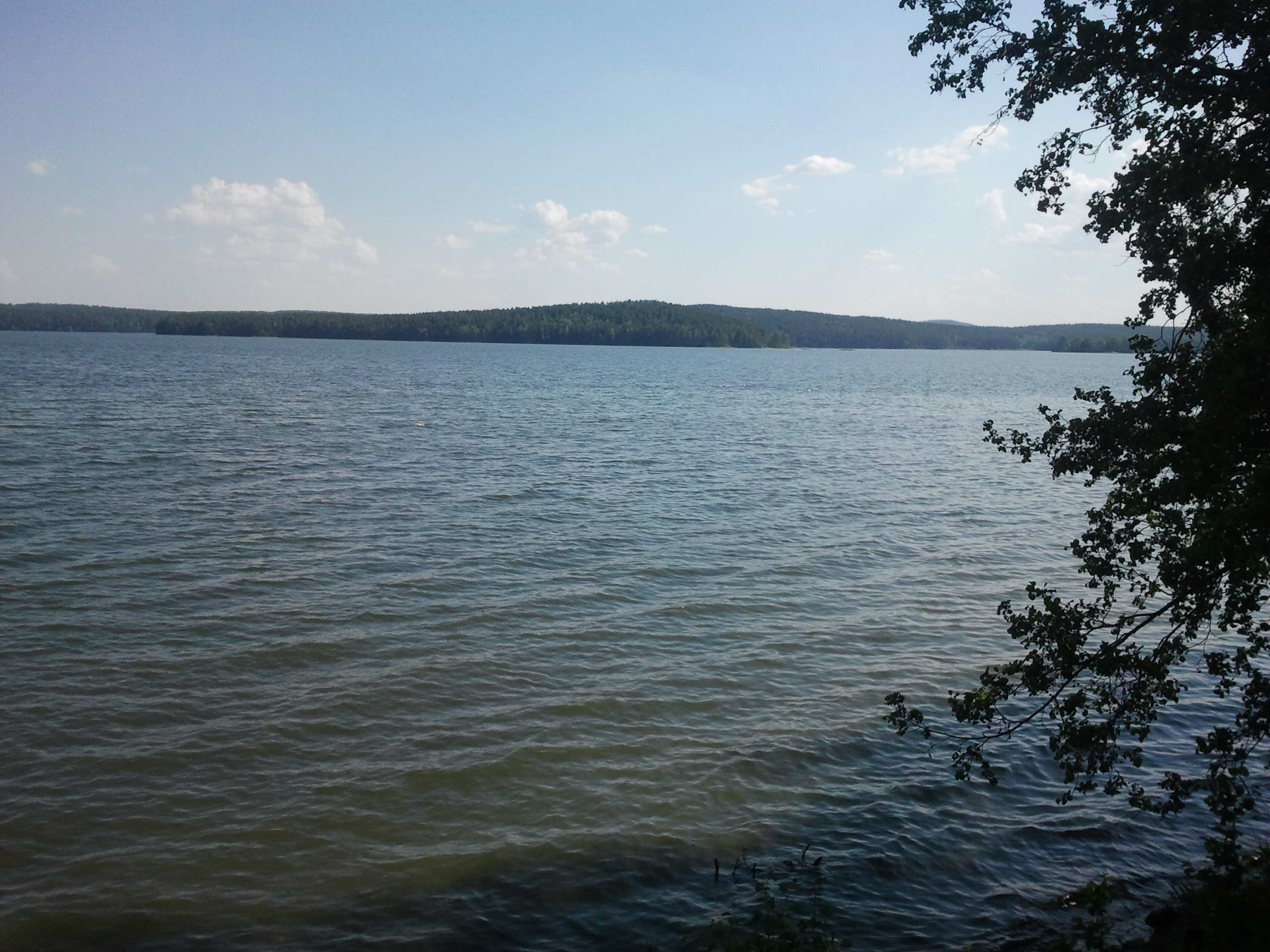
- lake Maloye Miassovo

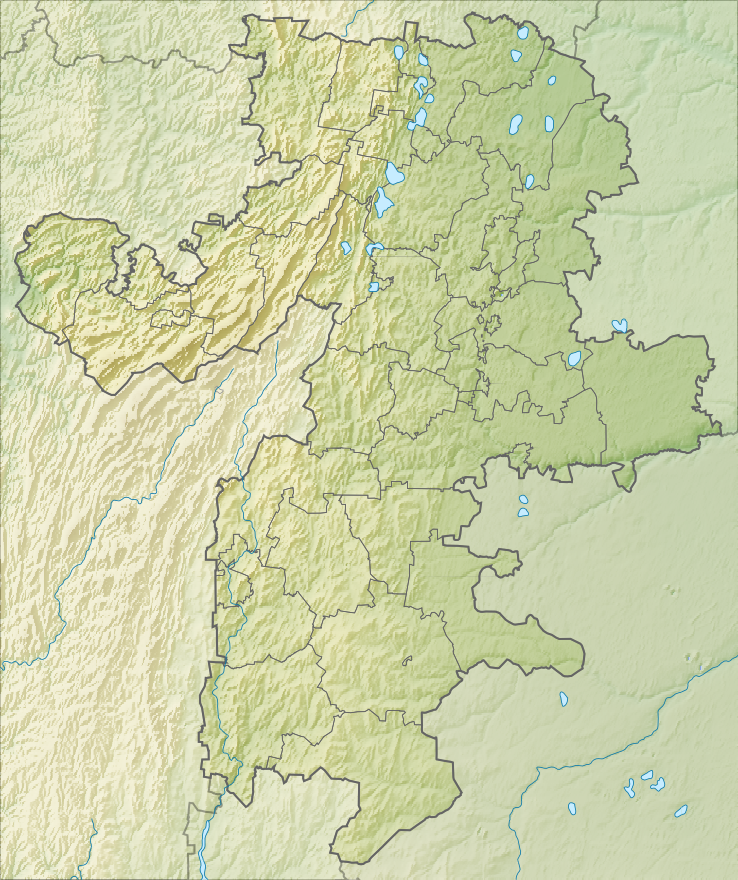
- Location within Chelyabinsk Oblast
- Coordinates: 55.10°N 60.21°E
- Primary inflows: Nyashevka, Chartonyshka, Demidovka etc
- Primary outflows: Karasi
- Basin countries: Russia
- Max. length: 6.6 km (4.1 mi)
- Max. width: 3.4 km (2.1 mi)
- Surface area: 11.23 km^{2} (4.34 sq mi)
- Max. depth: 7.7 m (25 ft)
- Surface elevation: 290 m (951 ft)
- Frozen: November–May
- Islands: 1
- Settlements: Miass

Lake Maloye Miassovo (Russian: Малое Миассово) is located in Chelyabinsk Oblast on the east side of the Ural Mountains, 62 kilometres (39 mi) west of Chelyabinsk and 10 kilometres (6.2 mi) east of Miass. It partially adjoins Ilmen Nature Reserve.

The lake is of tectonic origin; a duct connects the lake to Lake Bolshoye Miassovo. The lake has extensive aquatic vegetation, with wetlands and wooded ridges along the shore. The bottom is mainly rocky, with silt in places. Inflow of water is from keys and small rivers.

Fish found in the lake include roach, perch, pike, ruff, tench, crucian carp, burbot, and whitefish.

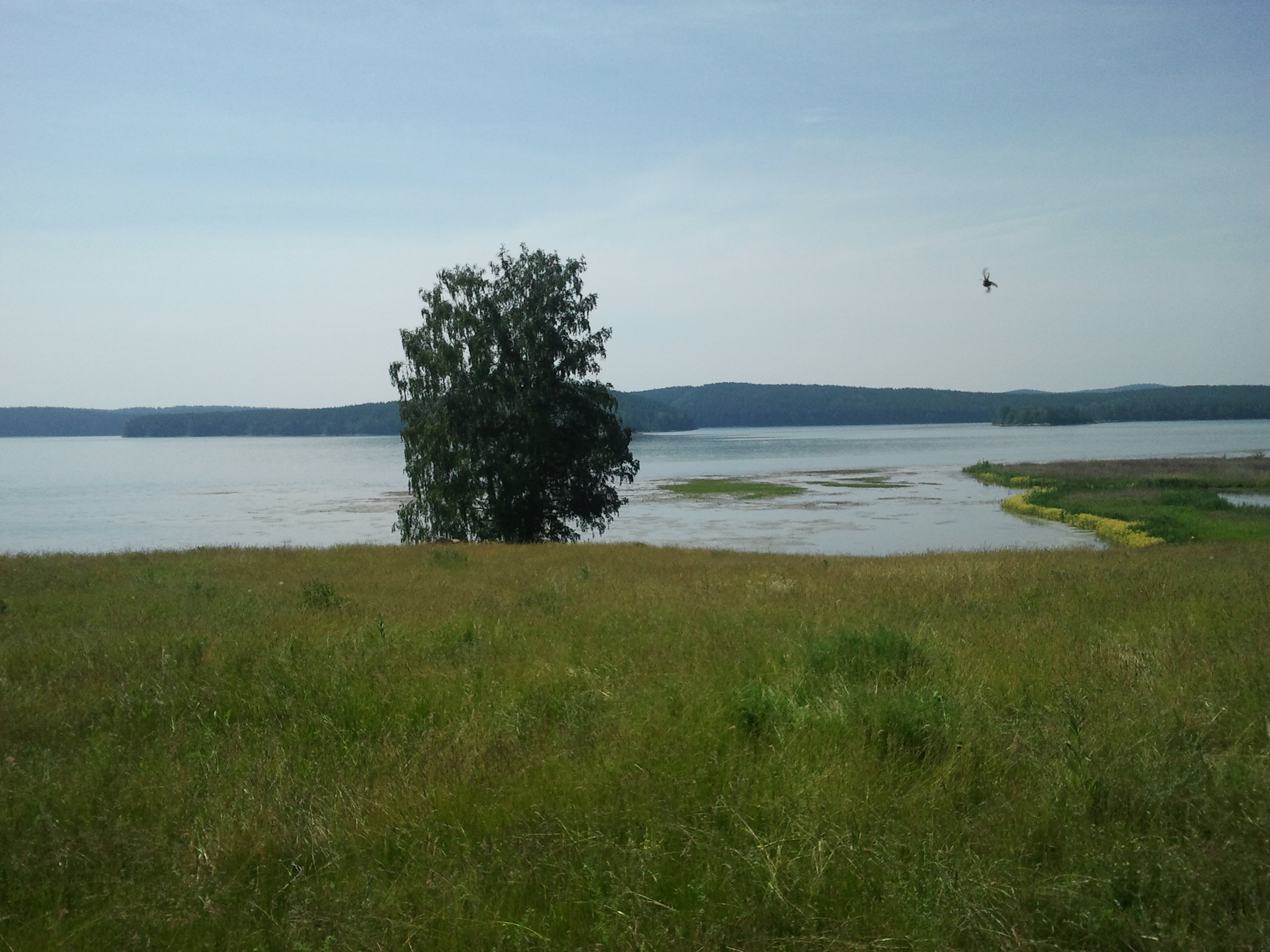
Maloye Miassovo lakeside

The lake is popular for recreation because of the beautiful landscapes. Pine and mixed forest grow on the banks. There are rock outcrops in the form of stone ridges, slabs, boulders and stone deposits.

Near the lake there are archaeological sites. The ancient human settlement "Linden oxbow lake" (Russian: Липовая курья) was a haven of a small tribe of about 5,000 years ago. A total of about 30 prehistoric settlements have been found, with a variety of artifacts: pottery vases with ornaments, stone knives, and scrapers.
