= Nikolay Dubinin =

Soviet and Russian biologist and academician (1907–1998)

- Born: Nikolay Petrovich Dubinin; 4 January 1907; Kronstadt, Russia
- Died: 26 March 1998 (aged 91); Moscow, Russia
- Known for: Work on the genetic basis of human individuality in different populations
- Awards: Hero of Socialist Labour
- Scientific career
- Fields: Genetics
- Institutions: Institute of Cytology and Genetics, Russian Academy of Sciences
- Academic advisors: Sergei Chetverikov

Nikolay Petrovich Dubinin (4 January 1907 – 26 March 1998) was a Soviet and Russian biologist and academician.

He worked under the supervision of Sergei Chetverikov. He was a corresponding member of the Division of Biological Sciences from 1946 and academician of the Division of General Biology from 1966. In 1946, Dubinin published a paper on the achievements of Soviet geneticists, in the journal Science.

He was a founding member of the Institute of Cytology and Genetics (IC&G) in the Russian Academy of Sciences. During the two years of his directorship (1957–1959) Dubinin worked out research goals at the IC&G and assembled its early staff.

In 1982, Dubinin and Dmitry Belyayev studied the genetic basis of human individuality in different populations. In 1983, they worked with V.I. Trubnikov studying the variability and heritability of neuro- and psychodynamic parameters. In 2002 the "Genetic Consequences of Emergency Radiation Situations" conference was dedicated to him.
