= Nikolai Koltsov =

Russian biologist

Nikolai Konstantinovich Koltsov
- Born: 14 July 1872; Moscow, Moscow Governorate, Russian Empire
- Died: 2 December 1940 (aged 68); Leningrad, Russian SFSR, Soviet Union
- Education: Moscow University
- Scientific career
- Fields: Genetics; Molecular biology
- Notable students: Nikolay Timofeeff-Ressovsky; Vladimir Pavlovich Efroimson; Aleksandr Promptov; Alexander Sergeevich Serebrovsky

Nikolai Konstantinovich Koltsov (Russian: Николай Константинович Кольцов; 14 July 1872 – 2 December 1940) was a Russian biologist and a pioneer of modern genetics. Among his students were Nikolay Timofeeff-Ressovsky, Vladimir Pavlovich Efroimson, A.S. Serebrovsky, and Nikolay Dubinin. Along with his students, he demonstrated the fine structure of genes, and examined the structure of the cell and pioneered the idea of a cytoskeleton. His career was cut short in Stalinist Russia after being falsely accused of supporting scientific racism. He died unexpectedly following government persecution and there are allegations that he was executed.

== Biography ==
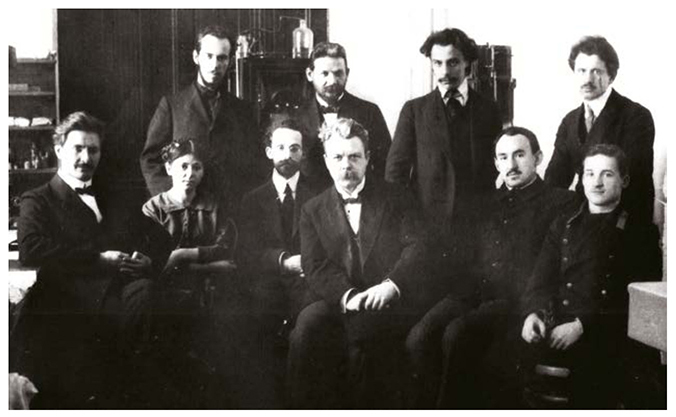
Koltsov (sitting at centre) with students, c. 1913

Koltsov was born in a well-to do family, his father was an accountant in a fur company, and graduated from Moscow University in 1894. His master's thesis was in comparative anatomy and embryology. He spent time at the marine biology research station in Naples and was influenced by many scientists including Felix Dohrn, Edmund Beecher Wilson, H.A. Driesch, R. B. Goldschmidt and C. A. Herbst. He became a professor at Moscow University (1895–1911). He translated "The Mechanism of Mendialn Heredity" into Russian and established the Institute of Experimental Biology in the middle of 1917, just before the October Revolution. He was a member of the Agricultural Academy (VASKhNIL). He was against the Tsarist regime but after the revolution, he opposed several policies of the new rule as well. In 1911 he left Moscow University and moved to the Shanyavsky Moscow City People's University. In 1920, Koltsov was arrested as a member of the non-existent "anti-Soviet Tactical Center" invented by the VCheKa. Prosecutor Nikolai Krylenko demanded the death sentence for Koltsov (67 of around 1000 arrested people were executed). However, after a personal appeal to Vladimir Lenin by Maxim Gorky, Koltsov was released and was restored to his position as the head of the Koltsov Institute of Experimental Biology.

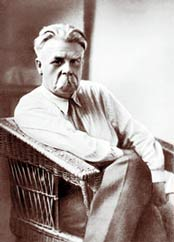
Koltsov in Kropotovo biostation, c. 1930

The politics of the Soviet Union made the idea of genes, particles that decided outcomes in life, as antithetical to the concept of individual freedom. Marxist ideologues also clubbed geneticists with eugenicists, racists, and fascists while also preferring ideas from Lamarckism as promoted by Trofim Lysenko.

In 1937 and 1939, the supporters of Lysenko published a series of propaganda articles against Nikolai Koltsov and Nikolai Vavilov. They wrote: "The Institute of Genetics of the Academy of Sciences not only did not criticize Professor Koltsov's fascistic nonsense, but even did not dissociate itself from his "theories" which support the racial theories of fascists". His death in 1940 was claimed to have been due to a stroke. However, "the biochemist Ilya Zbarsky revealed that the unexpected death of Koltsov was a result of his poisoning by the NKVD", the secret police of the Soviet Union. On the same day his wife, the scientist Maria Sadovnikova Koltsova, committed suicide.

== Research ==
Nikolai Koltsov worked on cytology and vertebrate anatomy. In 1903 Koltsov proposed that the shape of cells was determined by a network of tubules forming a skeleton which was later termed as the cytoskeleton. His studies were based on the sperm cells of various crustaceans and he examined their shapes and the physics of the structures. He saw the role of gel-sol transitions in the cytoplasm as key mechanisms for the cell structure. In 1927 Koltsov proposed that inherited traits would be inherited via a "giant hereditary molecule" which would be made up of "two mirror strands that would replicate in a semi-conservative fashion using each strand as a template". Koltsov used the expression omnis molecula ex molecula (every molecule comes from another molecule) based on Virchow's idea that all cells came from other cells. Around 1922, he began to conduct mutation experiments, subjecting Drosophila and crustaceans to X-ray radiation, some of which were influenced by discussions with H. J. Muller. He suggested that mutagenesis was possible not just with X-rays but also by gamma and cosmic rays and experimented by having a colleague, Heinrich Friesen, send fruitflies into stratospheric balloons. His student A. N. Promptov was able to study mutagenesis by ultraviolet rays while Vladimir Sakharov produced Drosophila mutants with iodine. His student P. I. Zhivago took an interest in systematic karyotype studies in 1926. In 1929, S. L. Frolova and B. L Astaurov found that karyotype differences prevented interbreeding in fruit flies. Koltsov extended his molecule copying principle and suggested that the chromosome was made up of a long polymer molecule and called it the "genonema". He wrote in 1935 that:

“I formulated this idea in the following thesis: Omnis molecula ex molecula, that is, any (of course, complex organic) molecule arises from the surrounding solution only in the presence of a ready-made molecule, and the corresponding radicals are placed by apposition (by van der Waals attractive forces or crystallization forces) on those loci of the present molecule serving as a primer, where the same radicals are located” (translated)

Koltsov examined sex determination and regulation in silkworms. His student B.L. Astaurov worked on inducing parthenogenesis in silkworms. Along with his colleagues, they sought to connect ideas of evolution with genetics and sought to create a new species in the laboratory.

US geneticist Richard Goldschmidt wrote about him: "There was the brilliant Nikolai Koltsov, probably the best Russian zoologist of the last generation, an enviable, unbelievably cultured, clear-thinking scholar, admired by everybody who knew him". He also suggested that electrical forces were involved in intracellular movement. He termed it as cataphoresis.

== Legacy ==
Koltsovo, a small municipality in Novosibirsk Oblast, in 2003 obtained the status of the Science town of the Russian Federation and was named after Nikolai Koltsov.

A species of marine organism Cadlina koltzovi was named after Nikolai Koltsov
