= Sergei Chetverikov =

Russian geneticist (1880–1959)

- Born: 6 May 1880; Moscow, Russian Empire
- Died: 2 July 1959 (aged 79); Gorky, USSR
- Known for: Research showing how early genetic theories applied to natural populations
- Scientific career
- Fields: Biology, genetics, theory of evolution
- Workplaces: Nikolai Koltsov Institute of Experimental Biology, Department of Genetics at Gorky University

Sergei Sergeevich Chetverikov (Russian: Серге́й Серге́евич Четверико́в; 6 May 1880 – 2 July 1959) was a Russian biologist and one of the early contributors to the development of the field of genetics. His research showed how early genetic theories applied to natural populations, and has therefore contributed towards the modern synthesis of evolutionary theory.

== Biography ==
By the time Chetverikov graduated from Moscow University in 1906, he had already published a paper that was among the first to discuss the phenomena of genetic drift and specifically the bottleneck effect, pointing to rapid, catastrophic drops in butterfly populations as a factor that could substantially alter the genetic diversity of a population via chance.

From 1909 to 1919, Chetverikov was an entomology lecturer at the Higher School for Women in Moscow. Chetverikov continued in his position after this institution was absorbed by the University of Moscow in the years following the October Revolution, expanding his lecturing to include systematics as well.

Between the two World Wars, Soviet biological research managed to connect genetics with field research on natural populations. Chetverikov led a team at the Nikolai Koltsov Institute of Experimental Biology in Moscow, and in 1926 produced a study examining the effects of isolation on speciation. This should have been one of the landmark papers of the modern synthesis. However, published only in Russian, it was largely ignored in the English-speaking world (though John Burdon Sanderson Haldane possessed a translation).

Chetverikov influenced several Russian geneticists who later came to work in the West, such as Theodosius Dobzhansky and Nikolay Timofeev-Ressovsky, both of whom continued to work in a similar style. The significance of Chetverikov's work came to light much later, by which time the evolutionary synthesis was virtually complete.

He was arrested by OGPU in 1929 and sent to exile to Yekaterinburg for five years. He later moved to Nizhny Novgorod and organized the Department of Genetics at Gorky University. He was dismissed from his post at the behest of Trofim Denisovich Lysenko in 1948.
