= Uzbekistan State World Languages University =

Public university in Uzbekistan

Coordinates: 41.2850°N 69.1931°E

- Uzbek: Oʻzbekiston davlat jahon tillari universiteti
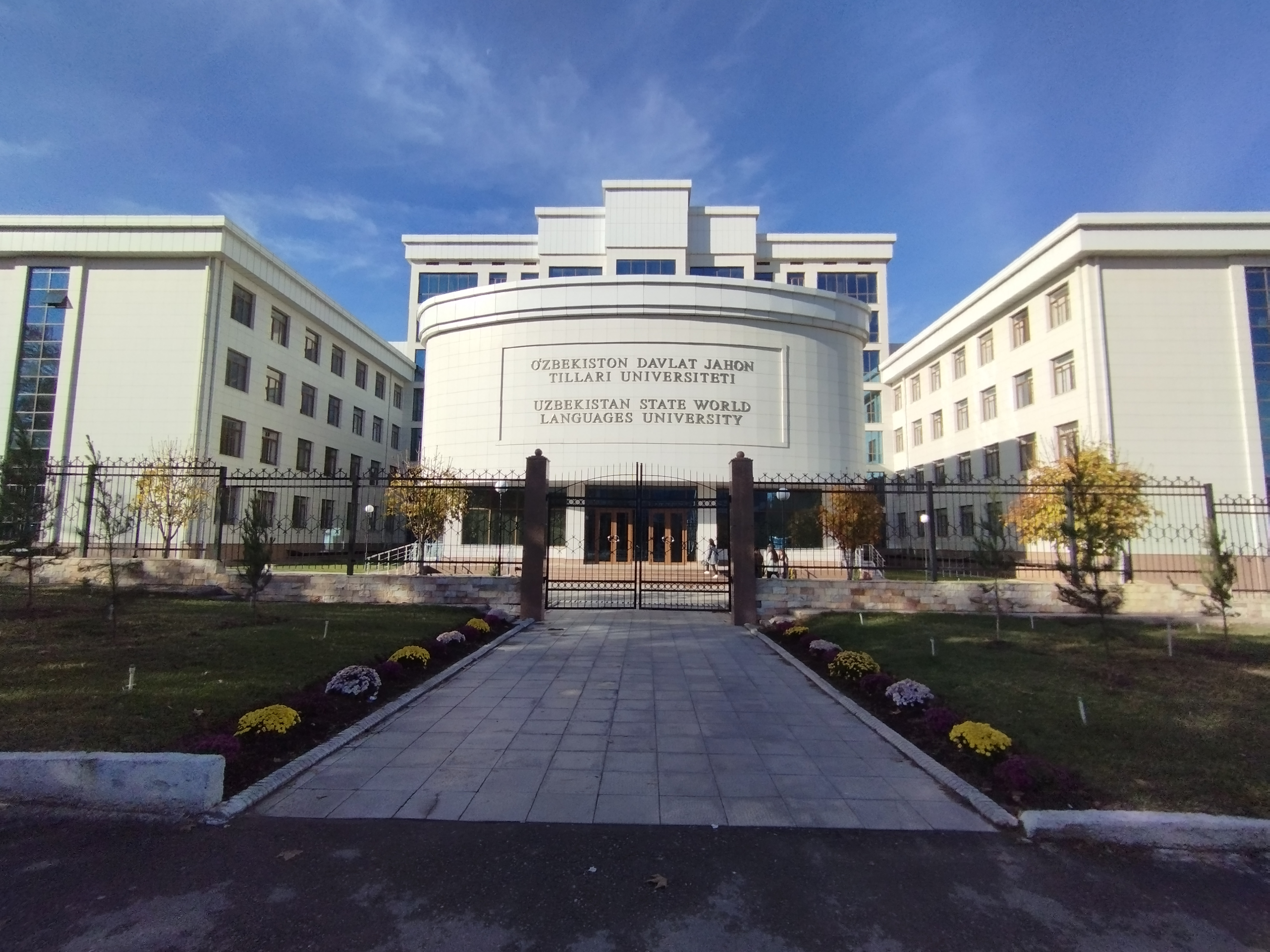
- A front side of Uzbekistan State World Languages University
- Other name: Russian: Узбекский государственный университет мировых языков
- Motto: A thing well said sounds wit in all languages.
- Type: National
- Established: May 12, 1992
- Founder: Islam Karimov, President of Uzbekistan
- Rector: Ilkhomjon Tukhtasinov
- Academic staff: 670 (2020)
- Students: 9,350 (2020)
- Location: Tashkent, Uzbekistan
- Language: English, some subjects are taught in Uzbek, Russian
- Website: uzswlu.uz

Uzbekistan State World Languages University (abbreviated as UzSWLU, Uzbek: Oʻzbekiston davlat Jahon Tillari Universiteti; abbreviated as OʻzDJTU) is a public university located in Tashkent, Uzbekistan. The university was established via merging two language universities by Islam Karimov in 1992.

The University is organised into 8 faculties: Roman & German Philology, Journalism, Translation Studies, Russian Philology and three English faculties, English Philology faculty and offers bachelor, master degrees in language-related fields.

It has also the main national responsibility for training and requalification ESL teachers, creating and updating language textbooks, teaching methods, strategies in Uzbekistan. In addition to that, the university also maintains its own printing service and coordinates the Centre for Development of Language Teaching Methods.

== History ==
UzSWLU is relatively young university, established by Islam Karimov, former Uzbekistan's President. In its current form, It was created in 1992 by the merger of two higher institutes in Tashkent as follows:

- Tashkent Pedagogical Institute of Foreign Languages, established in 1949.
- Russian Language and Literature Institute, established in 1963.

In 2007, the University established a lyceum that prepares middle school students to enter the University and also teaches language and humanitarian subjects in depth. Prior to this 2017, the University contained three lyceums, but with the introduction of an eleven-year educational school, this number was reduced to one. This lyceum is located on Bobur Street in Tashkent.

== Faculties ==
UzSWLU mainly focuses on language-related fields and it's divided into 7 faculties. The faculties are listed as follows:

- First English language faculty
- Second English language faculty
- Third English language faculty
- Roman and German Philology
- Russian Philology
- Translation Studies
- International Journalism
- English Philology faculty

The University has three English faculties but they cover different fields, for example, the first faculty is aimed at training interpreters.

=== First English faculty ===
This faculty was firstly established on 12 May 1992 by Islam Karimov.

The history of the faculty is directly linked to the history of the university as it was opened in the same year with the establishment of the university. This faculty actually trains ESL teachers and also gives them a choice to learn second language.

The list of the second languages which are taught are given as follows, and the student can choose which language to learn: French, German, Arabic, Spanish, Turkish and Chinese.

It also cooperates with some international companies and universities. The partners of the faculty are given as follows: British Council in Uzbekistan, American Embassy in Uzbekistan, "ITEC" program of Indian Embassy, educational program of Malaysian Embassy in Uzbekistan and with the "TEMPUS" program of European Union. There are three main departments which are currently located at the faculty, and they are: "English language phonetics and phonology department", "English language grammar and history department", "Professional lexica department". This is the oldest faculty in this university.

=== Second English faculty ===
The second faculty shares the same structure and serves the similar purposes as the faculty. However, the main differences between the faculties could be found.

It's one of the youngest faculties that was created after splitting the first English faculty in 2002. It was granted a special status in 2009 so now it's fully independent college that is working. Nowadays, there are about 1461 students who are currently involved with the studies at the faculty.

There's more than 100 lecturers and teachers and more 61 of them have or hold a doctor degree. The faculty offers the right to choose one course as the second language, rather than English. There are four main departments at the faculty, which are given as follows: "Practical subjects on English language", "Lexicology of English language", "Stylistics of English language" and "Natural subjects".

=== Third English language faculty ===
The third one is the same with its structure and the educational materials with its two ancestors, that's mentioned before.

This faculty is also considered to be the youngest English language related faculty of the University,

as it was first established by the Decree of the President of Republic of Uzbekistan Islam Karimov number PD-1875 on the topic of "Developing the systems of learning foreign languages" in the year of 2012 on 10 December, and by the Edict of President of Republic of Uzbekistan Islam Karimov number PD-1971 on the topic of "Developing the "Uzbekistan State University of World Languages"", in the year of 2013 on 23 May.

Nowadays, there are about 1204 students who are involved with the studies at the "Third English language faculty", and in a short period of time the faculty became very famous among the young generation of Uzbekistan, as it gives essential practical and theoretical knowledge about the English language.

The students can obtain the bachelor's degree from the faculty, from the following branches which are: "Teaching of philology and foreign languages (English language)" and "Foreign language and its literature (English language)".

Students can obtain their master's degree from the faculty, by the branches which are given as follows: "English language" and "Literature" (English literature). There are three main departments at the "Third English language faculty" and they are given as follows:

- English language and English literature – focuses on grammar of English language and the literature of English language
- Learning the English language in an integrated way – teaches the students to the essential parts of English and the subjects at the department are unusual and complicated
- Theoretical subjects – the biggest department at the faculty, as it covers all the other subjects which are: History, Native language (Uzbek), Physical Education, the second language (One of French, Spanish, Arab, Turkish, Indian people, Chinese, Japanese, Malaysian and Italian languages)

=== Roman-German philology faculty ===
Roman and German philology faculty was opened in 2013 by consolidation all non-English departments that focus on German, French and Spanish.

There are 805 students who are currently involved with the studies at the "Roman-German philology faculty", and there are more than 100 teachers at the faculty. Most of the teachers have their scientific degrees on their related subjects and languages, and 58 of them are considered as the professors.

=== Russian philology faculty ===
This is a well-known faculty that fulfils the demand of Russian specialists and Russian teachers in Uzbekistan since there is a lot of Russian schools or students who would like to study subjects exclusively in Russian.

=== Translation Studies ===
Opened in 1994, the faculty is not really popular among the applicants, however, the needs for the interpreters in Uzbekistan grow year by year.

They teach English, French, Spanish and German to their students and master's degree programme was opened in 2005. The sponsors of the faculty are given as follows: Moscow State Language University, Perudja University (Italy), Beijing Chinese language and Culture Institute, Seoul Chun Ang University, KOICA, Deli University (India), JICA International Corporation (Japan), British Council in Uzbekistan and many other institutions.

There are 6 main departments which are currently located at the faculty, and they are given as follows:

- Interpreting theory and practice – gives essential knowledge about interpreting techniques and enlarges the theoretical knowledge by practice
- Chinese language theory and practice – teaches the Chinese language by the theoretical and practical points of view. Teaches the techniques of interpreting form Chinese language.
- Intensive teaching of the second language – teaches the second language which could be chosen by the student, in a short period of time, by intensive and fast pace of teaching.
- East languages – techniques of speaking and using the "Eastern languages", and the similarities between the "Eastern languages".
- Modern pedagogic technologies – gives essential knowledge about the techniques and technologies of teaching languages and philology.
- Information and communication technologies – teaches how to use the information technologies, as the right and proper tool for the interpreting work.

=== English philology faculty ===
The activity of this faculty started from the 2020-2021 academic year. The Faculty of English Philology operates on the basis of the laws of the Republic of Uzbekistan, editorial documents of the Republic of Uzbekistan, decisions of the Cabinet of Ministers of the Republic of Uzbekistan, orders of the Ministry of Higher and Secondary Special Education of the Republic of Uzbekistan, and the internal rules of the Uzbekistan State World Languages University. All textbooks and educational processes are determined by the Ministry of Higher and Secondary Special Education of the Republic of Uzbekistan and approved by the Government of Uzbekistan. The faculty includes 4 departments, which are as follows:

- Department of English functional lexicon
- Department of practical aspects of English language
- Department of English language teaching and educational technologies
- Department of theoretical sciences of English

== Lyceum ==
Nearly, all of the higher educational institutions of Uzbekistan are linked with the academic lyceums and the colleges that prepare some students for them. There's actually a lyceum that was opened in 2007 and now located on Bobur Str.

=== Academic Lyceum of the UzSWLU ===
The lyceum enrols only the students who have finished their middle school and then successfully passed the admission tests.

Currently, this lyceum has three faculties: Foreign Languages, Humanities and Natural Sciences. Each department has its own curriculum and specialized subjects, for example, the faculty of foreign languages is exclusively engaged in teaching English at the intermediate and higher levels and the humanities department focuses only on history and related subjects; the main goal of the lyceum is to prepare a graduate with a sufficient level of knowledge for the university.

== See also ==
- List of universities in Uzbekistan
- Inha University in Tashkent
- Tashkent State Technical University
- Tashkent Institute of Irrigation and Melioration
- Tashkent Financial Institute
- Moscow State University in Tashkent named M.V Lomonosov
- Tashkent Automobile and Road Construction Institute
- Tashkent State University of Economics
- Tashkent State Agrarian University
- Tashkent State University of Law
- Tashkent University of Information Technologies
- University of World Economy and Diplomacy
- Westminster International University in Tashkent
- Philology
- Language school
- Omsk Foreign Language Institute
- Taipei Language Institute
- Klingon Language Institute

== External links and sources ==
- Uzbek State Test Centre
- News about the university
- Article and news about the university
- Brochure about the university
- Article about the university
- University in maps
- Forum page discussing the university
- Information about the University
- News about the university
- Brochure about the university
- University in the maps
- Events at the university
- Article and news from official site of the university
- Events and news from the university
- Events at the university
- Chinese delegation at the University
