= Moscow State University, Tashkent =

University in Tashkent

Coordinates: 41°18′01″N 69°16′52″E

Branch of Moscow State University Named for M.V. Lomonosov in Tashkent
- Toshkentagi M. V. Lomonosov nomidagi Moskva Davlat Universiteti
- Moscow State University in Tashkent
- Type: Public
- Established: 24 February 2006
- Rector: Valeriy Kudryavtsev
- Location: Tashkent, Uzbekistan
- Language: Russian
- Website: msu.uz

Moscow State University, Tashkent, or Branch of Moscow State University Named for M.V. Lomonosov in Tashkent, was established in 2006 by the government of Uzbekistan as a branch of Moscow State University. The university primarily focuses on two areas: psychology and computer science. The campus is at 22 Amir Temur Prospect.

== Founding ==
The decision of opening the branch was signed at the meeting between the presidents of the Russian Federation and Uzbekistan on 14 November 2005 in Moscow.

The branch was established in Tashkent on 24 February 2006 by a resolution of the President of Uzbekistan Islam Karimov. The branch was allocated a complex of buildings under construction, in which the academic lyceum was originally supposed to be placed at the Tashkent Automobile and Road Institute.

== Mission and objectives ==
The purpose of the university is training qualified specialists and professionals. The students are taught to the standards of Moscow State University and of international institutions, while upholding the goals of the national education system of Uzbekistan. Performance in MSU is evaluated according to legislation of the Republic of Uzbekistan and the Russian Federation.

These are the official objectives of the university:

- Train highly qualified specialists who can solve problems in their branch of science by combining theoretical knowledge and scientific research
- Integrate scientific disciplines by using the scientific and educational potential power of MSU, bringing talented people to do scientific research
- Work with international institutions to develop professionals in their scientific disciplines, paying attention to world-cultural processes
- Enlarge the mutual cooperation among Uzbek, Russian, and international specialists to train fully developed employees
- Develop textbooks and other educational materials
- Re-train and enhance the knowledge and qualifications of professors and teachers in new academic disciplines and professions
- Organize the procedures to print scientific works and disseminate them

== Campus ==
The MSU campus has one of the biggest resource centers among Uzbekistani universities, contains more than 8,000 textbooks, books, magazines, and other materials. It also has an e-library, a multimedia studio, and a video conference hall. The students are able to watch video lectures related to their studies after class. The video conference hall is mainly used by students to attend live video lectures that are broadcast from Moscow. In addition to this, there is a hall on campus that can hold 220 people and allows larger lectures and events to be held.

The campus has facilities to allow students to participate in athletics in their free time. There is a large winter sports center that has seats for spectators, and an athletics complex located outdoors, with 3 tennis courts, two volleyball pitches, and one court for basketball. To assist the students as much as possible in their studies, MSU has opened a polygraph center on the campus. This center helps the students complete their tasks faster.

There is a medical center on campus that makes up a large portion of the main building. MSU even has its own hotel with 10 rooms, which are mainly used by visiting teachers called to the university to give lectures.

== Structure ==
Financing of works in the branch at the expense of the state budget of Uzbekistan in the form of grants listed below Ministry of Higher Education of the Republic, and payments of students on a fee-contract basis.

Now the post of the head of the branch is occupied by the doctor of physical and mathematical sciences, professor V. B. Kudryavtsev (Moscow), deputy heads – V. A. Nosov (Moscow), T. Yu. Bazarov (Moscow), Executive director – E. M. Saydamatov, Deputy Executive Directors – T.A. O. Karshiev, A. B. Mamanazarov, Sh. Sh. Mirzaev.

== Faculties ==
Currently, the branch has two types of bachelor's and master's degrees: "Psychology" and "Applied Mathematics and Computer Science". They provide students with essential theoretical, and practical knowledge, in order to become professionals on their fields.

=== Faculty of Psychology ===
The main purpose of the "Faculty of Psychology" is training professionals who work and assist in fields of medical sciences, solve difficult problems, and help citizens. The length of studies in this faculty is set at five years. The lessons are given only in Russian. The curriculum involves both general and professional subjects:

1. General psychology
2. Experimental psychology
3. General psychological practicum
4. History of psychology
5. Zoo-psychology
6. Psycho-genetics
7. Methodical psychology
8. Mathematical ways of psychology
9. Development of psychology
10. Social psychology
11. Psychology of work
12. Clinical psychology
13. Special psychology
14. Psycho-physiology
15. Methods of teaching psychology

=== Faculty of Analytical Mathematics and Computer Science ===
The Faculty of Analytical Mathematics and Computer Science is the main faculty at Moscow State University. It focuses on subjects in analytical mathematics, computer science, and computer programming. The length of study is set at 4 years. All of the lessons are in Russian. The curriculum's priorities are toward developing computer science skills in students. After graduation students can work at academic institutions, universities, organs of government, banks, insurance companies, finance companies, consulting companies, national and international corporations that employ computer technologies. Subjects are listed below:

First year:

- Discrete mathematics
- Linear algebra and analytic geometry
- Mathematical analysis
- Algorithms
- Assembly language
- English language
- Fundamentals of cybernetics
- History
- Philosophy

Second year:

- Functioning analysis
- Mathematical analysis
- English language
- Simple differential equations
- Operating systems
- Physics
- Fundamentals of psychology
- Programming systems
- Probability theorem and mathematical system

Third year:

- Optimization methods
- Artificial intelligence
- Constructing compilers
- Databases
- Physical fundamentals of computer systems
- Programming languages
- Equations of mathematical physics

Fourth year:

- Mathematical logics
- Game theory
- Concepts of modern informatics
- Law
- Modern problems of analytical mathematics
- Sociology
- Special course

Examinations at "Faculty of Analytical Mathematics and Computer Science" are held in three subjects, and they are:

1. Algorithms. Combination
2. Fundamentals of cryptography
3. Mathematical logics

== Scientific work ==
On 28 September 2018, the branch held the Republican Scientific and Practical Conference "Actual problems of psychology in Uzbekistan".

== Admissions ==
Admission procedures and attestations are in according with standards set by Moscow State University. The curriculum, educational programs, and educational materials are also approved by Moscow State University in Tashkent. Until 2011 years the study at the Faculty of Psychology lasted for 5 years (specialist), currently the period of study in both areas – 4 years (bachelor). The term of study for graduate programs – 2 years.

=== Entrance examinations ===
To complete the admission procedure, students must pass examinations approved by Moscow State University and Uzbekistan's ministry of higher education. Interested applicants must provide needed documents and pass 3 examinations according to the faculty they choose. The Faculty of Psychology requires passing 3 written examinations in general subjects:

- Mathematics
- Biology
- Russian language

Interested applicants in the Faculty of Analytical Mathematics and Computer Science must also pass written examinations in 3 general subjects:

- Mathematics
- Computer science
- Russian language

Applicants who have completed the examination procedure are offered positions at the university as students.

== Branch training ==
The lessons are taught in Russian by teachers from Uzbekistan and the Russian Federation. The head branch of Moscow State University annually sends specialists to the school to supervise the organization of lessons and to act as scientific advisors for the bachelor's and master's degree theses.

As of 2017, each faculty has 20 budgeted and 30 contracted places for studying in the bachelor-degree program and 4 budgeted and 6 contracted places in the master's program.

Graduates will be awarded with original Moscow State University diplomas.

== Students ==
In 2018, 434 students were enrolled at the branch, which in 397 were undergraduate and 37 were undergraduate. 90% undergraduates are consist of bachelor graduates of the branch. The representing team of the branch by (T.Sytdikov, B.Soliev, A.Bystrygova, trainer – B. Ashirmatov) qualified for the final stage of the International Student Competition in programming in 2014, where it took the 37th place among the 122 participant teams.

Among the students there are prize-winners in international sports competitions – Farangis Aliyeva (1st place for Open CIS Cup – ITF World Taekwondo Cup).

== Branch graduates ==
In 2019, the Tashkent branch of MSU graduated over 600 specialists. Some of them continued their studies as postgraduate students in Moscow State University and defended their thesis for the competition Candidate of Science degrees.

Graduates of the branch work in various ministries of Uzbekistan (Information Technologies and Communications, Higher and Secondary Special Education, Public Education; Preschool Education), Institute of Mathematics of Academy of Sciences, in the scientific and practical research center "Oila" ("Family"), National University of Uzbekistan, in the "Lukoil" company, in the Republican Center for Social Adaptation of Children, the public children's fund "Sen yolg`iz emassan" ("You are not alone"), "Association of Psychologists of Uzbekistan", and the Federation of Gymnastics of Uzbekistan.

== See also ==
- Inha University in Tashkent
- Management Development Institute of Singapore in Tashkent
- Tashkent Automobile and Road Construction Institute
- Tashkent Financial Institute
- Tashkent Institute of Irrigation and Melioration
- Tashkent State Agrarian University
- Tashkent State Technical University
- Tashkent State University of Economics
- Tashkent State University of Law
- Tashkent University of Information Technologies
- TEAM University Tashkent
- Turin Polytechnic University in Tashkent
- University of World Economy and Diplomacy
- Westminster International University in Tashkent
