= Shuhrat Sirojiddinov =

Uzbek scientist (born 1961)

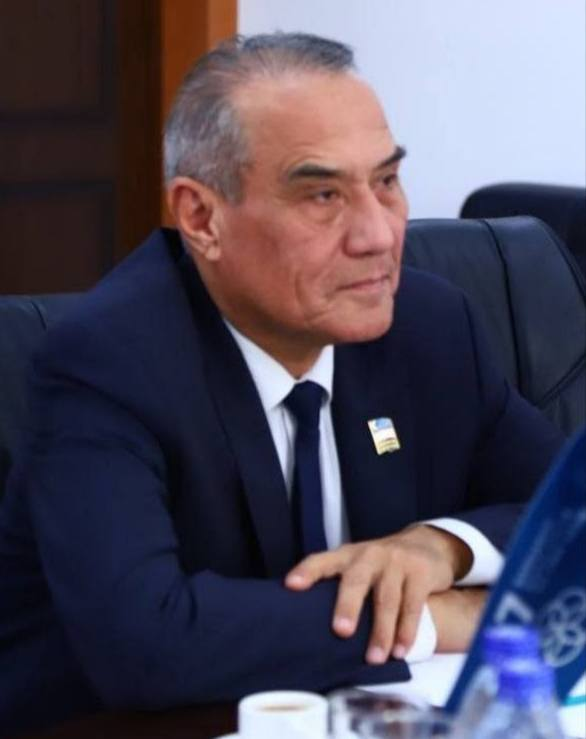
- Born: Shuhrat Sirojiddinov; 23 July 1961 (age 65); Samarqand Region Kattakurgan District
- Citizenship: Uzbekistan
- Education: National University of Uzbekistan
- Awards: Chingiz Aitmatov international award; State award of the first degree in the field of literature of the Republic of Uzbekistan; Honored youth coach in Uzbekistan
- Scientific career
- Fields: Literature
- Workplaces: Alisher Navo'i Tashkent State University of Uzbek Language and Literature
- Website: https://tsuull.uz

Shuhrat Sirojiddinov is a Doctor of Philology, professor, and a member of the Academy of Sciences of Uzbekistan — academician. He has been the Rector of Alisher Navo’i Tashkent State University of Uzbek Language and Literature since 2016.

== Early life and career ==
Shuhrat Sirojiddinov was born on 23 July 1961, in Samarkand Region, Uzbekistan, and from an early age, he demonstrated a profound interest in literature. This passion for oriental studies fueled his determination to unravel the complexities of ancient manuscripts. In pursuit of his academic aspirations, he enrolled at the Faculty of Oriental Studies at the National University of Uzbekistan in 1978 and graduated from this institution in 1984. From 1987 to 1993, he served as an associate professor at Samarkand State University, after which he held the positions of senior researcher and chief scientific secretary at the Samarkand branch of the Academy of Sciences of Uzbekistan from 1993 to 1998. Afterwards, from 1998 to 2003, he was appointed as a vice-president of the 'Imam Bukhari' international Foundation. At the University of World Economy and Diplomacy, Sirojiddinov served as the department's chairman between 2003 and 2005. After then, he was appointed as the vice-rector of the Uzbekistan State University of World Languages from 2005 until 2012. He became the Samarkand State Institute of Foreign Languages' rector in 2012, a position he maintained until 2014. From 2014 until 2016, he continued to work as a rector at National University of Uzbekistan. Sirojiddinov was appointed as the rector of Alisher Navo’i Tashkent State University of Uzbek Language and Literature, and the position he has been holding since 2016 to the present day.

== Awards and academic titles ==
Sirojiddinov has an extensive portfolio of over 300 scholarly and educational works, which includes 15 textbooks and manuals, 13 monographs, and 230 scientific and popular scientific articles. In recognition of his valuable contributions to the field of science, he was honored with the prestigious Chingiz Aitmatov International Prize. Furthermore, Sirojiddinov received the distinguished First-level Uzbekistan State Prize on Literature in 2013. Notably, in 2021, he was awarded the honorary title of "Honoured Youth Mentor of the Republic of Uzbekistan" established by the President of the Republic of Uzbekistan. Sirojiddinov is an Honorary Doctor of the Azerbaijan National Academy of Sciences; Honorary Professor of Dobrolyubov Nizhny Novgorod State Linguistic University (Russia); Co-chairman of the International Association of Central Asian Studies (Korea); Scientific advisor of the Institute of Eurasian Turkic Studies (Korea); Member of New York Academy of Sciences (US), Member of California Academy of Sciences (US), Chairman of the Scientific Council for Doctoral Degrees in Philological Sciences (Tashkent, Uzbekistan); Member of the Scientific Council for Doctoral Degrees of Tashkent State Institute of Oriental Studies, Uzbekistan State World Languages University, and the National University of Uzbekistan; Deputy Chairman of the Governmental Commission for Terminology of the Republic of Uzbekistan; Member of the Writers' Union of Uzbekistan; Member of the Central Election Commission of Uzbekistan. On 4 October 2023, due to Sirojiddinov's initiatives, the Center for Uzbek Language and Culture was established at Osh State University in the Kyrgyz Republic and he was awarded the honorary title of Professor by Osh State University. Shuhrat Sirojiddinov was appointed a full member of the Academy of Sciences of Uzbekistan and received the title of academician on 23 December 2023.

In 2026, Academician Shukhrat Sirojiddinov was awarded the Gold Medal of the International Organization of Turkic Culture - TURKSOY for his contribution to the development of culture and literature of the Turkic world.

== Endeavors in scholarly publications ==
Sirojiddinov is a Member of the editorial board of several journals and scientific publications such as Turkologiya′ (Azarbaijan), Müqayiseli edebiyyatşünasliq (Azarbaijan), The Journal of Eurasian Turkic Studies (Korea), Karabuk Turkoloji Degresi (Turkey), World Literature (Uzbekistan), Star of East (Uzbekistan), Imam Bukhari Studies (Uzbekistan), The Issues of Philology (Uzbekistan), Environmental Earth Journal (Uzbekistan), and The Youth (Uzbekistan). At the same time he is a chief editor of the international scientific journals Xorijiy Filologiya (Foreign Philology), O’zMU Xabarnomasi (National University Herald), Oltin Bitiklar (Golden Scripts), Uzbekistan: Language and culture etc.

== Efforts to develop Turkology ==
A number of monographs by Sirojiddinov are devoted to the life and work of Alisher Navai. He was research advisor to 5 doctor of science and 11 doctor of philosophy in philology. Shuhrat Sirojiddinov's fundamental monograph ′Alisher Navai: comparative-typological, textological analysis of sources′ reveals Alisher Navai's contribution to the culture of the Turcik peoples.

He has been participating in the development of educational and humanitarian field, as well as cultural relations between Uzbekistan and Turkic-speaking countries. It directly contributes to the development of relations between Uzbekistan and Turkey, as well as, Turkic-speaking countries in the field of science and higher education institutions.

Under Sirojiddinov's leadership, the Uzbek language is being taught at universities in the US, Japan, the Republic of Korea, China, India, Great Britain, Germany, and Afghanistan. At the same time, under his leadership, the Alisher Navo'i Tashkent State University of Uzbek Language and Literature achieved a number of successes in a short period of time. In particular, Alisher Navo'i Tashkent State University of Uzbek Language and Literature established cooperative relations with more than 50 educational institutions of the world, became a member of three international associations (Korea: International Association for the Study of Central Asia, Russia: Association of World Universities, US: Uzbek-American Society); Centers of Uzbek language and culture named after Alisher Navoi were opened in the Republics of Russia, China, India, and Azerbaijan.

== Legacy and contribution to Science ==
Sirojiddinov is a prominent scholar in Alisher Navo'i studies and well-known oriental manuscripts expert. He has several publications on the study and analysis of Alisher Navoi's work which include Beliefs of Alisher Navo'i, Alisher Navoi. Comparative-typological textual analysis of sources, Mir 'Alī Shīr Navā'ī the Great, The Inspiring Inspiration of Navo’i, The Charm of Navoi's Verses, Navo'i Studies intended for students of higher educational institutions, Amir Alisher, The Frontiers of Science and Imagination, Navo’i in the acknowledgement of his contemporaries. In addition, Lessons of Textual Studies, Aspects of Uzbek Textual Studies, are dedicated to the field of textual studies, as well as a number of books such as Methods of conversion of Gregorian and Hijri Calendars, Introduction to Islamic Philosophy: Kalam, Philosophical Reflections of Uzbek Classical Literature, Interpretation of Alisher Navoi’s life in chronicles and memoirs of XV-XVI centuries, World Religions, Biography of Maulana Lutfullah, Theology of Sufi Allayar Interpretation of Human Spiritual Perfectness in Poetry, Views of Central Asian Scholars in Philosophy, Boundaries of Science and Imagination, Tolerance as the Educational Basis of Religions, Fundamentals of Literary Translation has been a noticeably contribution to promote Uzbek Humanitarian disciplines.
