= Inha University in Tashkent =

Coordinates: 41.3385°N 69.3346°E

- Type: National university
- Established: October 4, 2014
- Rector: Muzaffar Jalolov
- Undergraduates: 370 (as of 2016)
- Location: Tashkent, Uzbekistan
- Colors: Dark blue
- Website: www.inha.uz
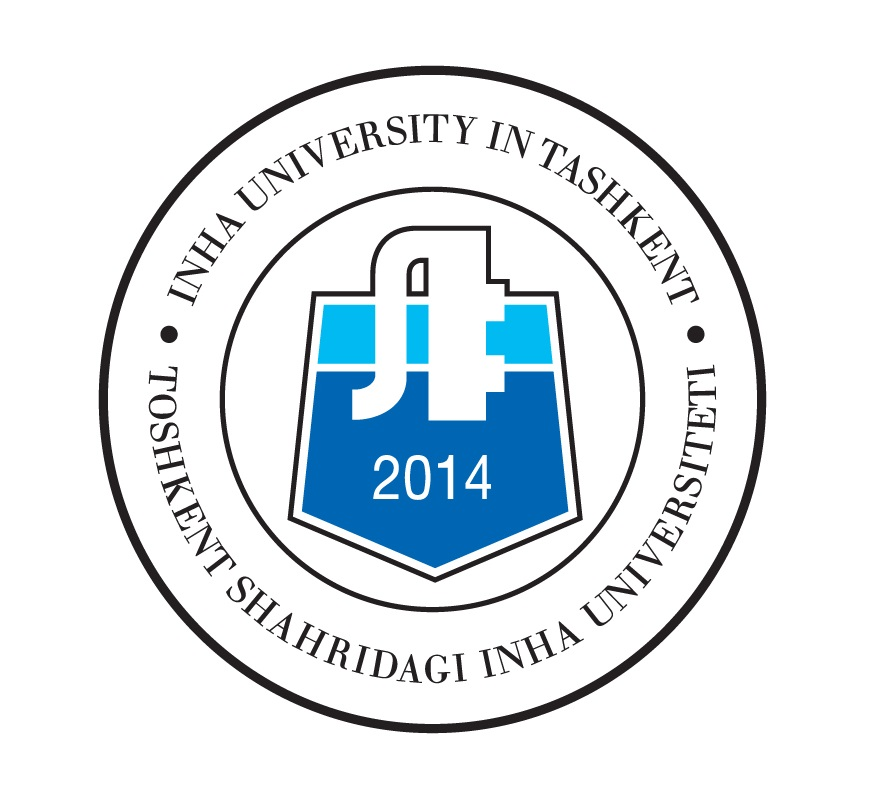

Inha University in Tashkent or IUT (Toshkent Shahridagi Inha Universiteti in Uzbek) is a branch of the Korean Inha University in Tashkent, Uzbekistan. Inha University in Tashkent has two departments - School of Computer and Information Engineering, and the School of Logistics.

Inha University in Tashkent was established according to the resolution of the first president of the Republic of Uzbekistan. IUT is the result of cooperation between Inha University of Korea and the government of Uzbekistan with the goal of developing IT leaders. Inha University in Korea is oriented toward engineering, IT, management, logistics, etc. The curriculum and academic programs of Inha University in Tashkent are similar to those of its Korean counterpart.

== Campus ==
The campus is based in Tashkent city. There is a main building with seven floors and a new building with three floors which holds the conference hall.

== Schools ==
- School of Computer and Information Engineering (SOCIE)
- School of Logistics and Business Administration (SOL)

== Facilities ==
=== The Information Resource Center ===
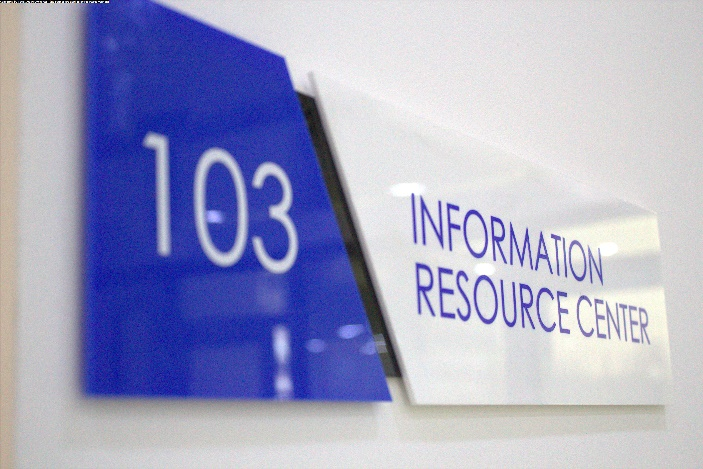
Information Resource Center

The Information Resource Centre is equipped with the computers that run Microsoft Office Professional (Word, Excel, PowerPoint), Internet Explorer to access the Internet and e-mail, and software required to support the curriculum.

Books, theses, reports, journals, magazines, reference works and non-print materials are included in the holdings of the centre. With ID cards, students can use the printing, scanning and photocopying services.

The Information Resource Centre is located on the 1st floor, room 103.

=== PC labs ===
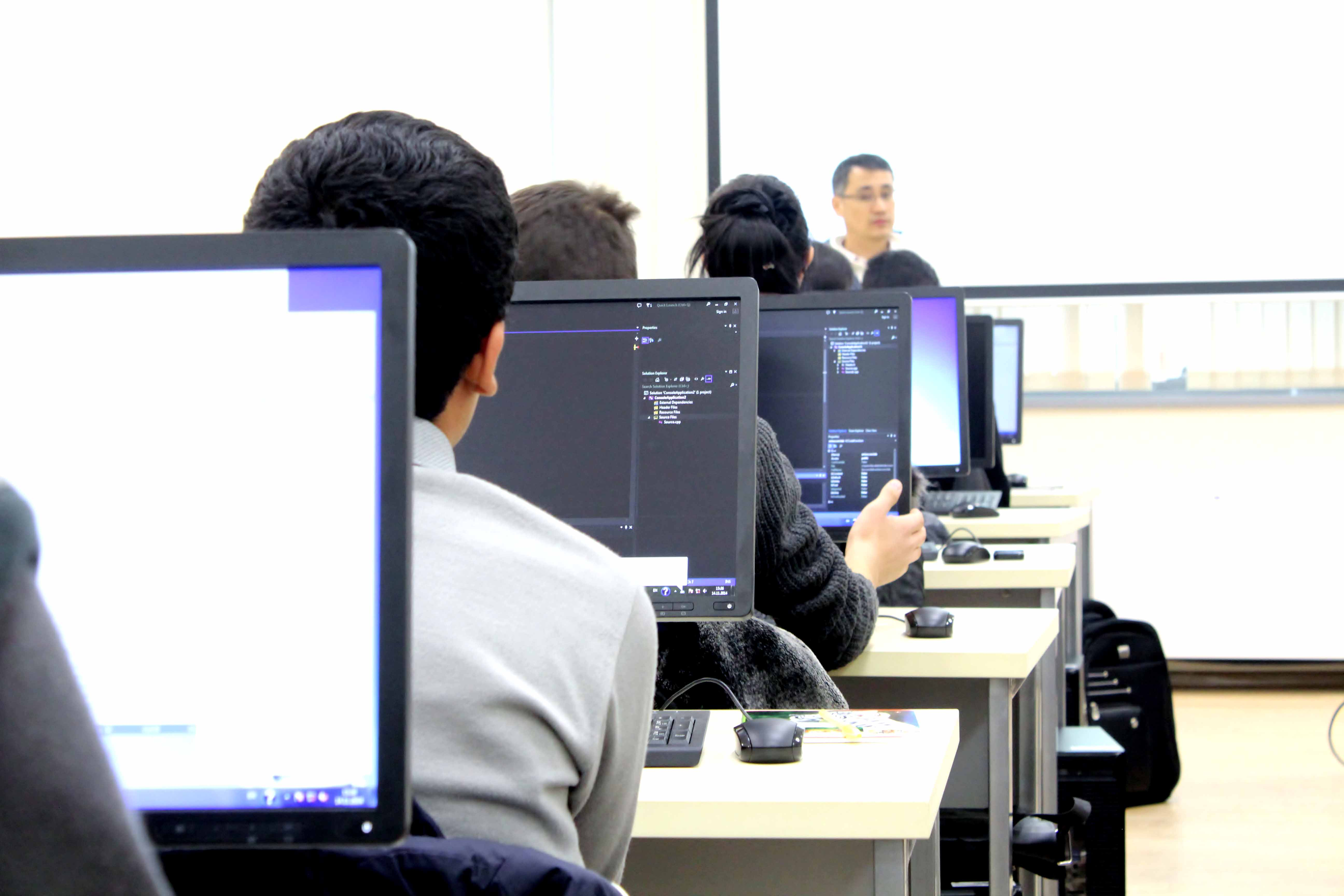
PC lab

There are three main PC labs for use by IUT students. The total number of PCs is 150. The main objective of the PC lab is to learn fundamental concepts of object-oriented programming and to practice them with C++.

=== Physics Lab ===
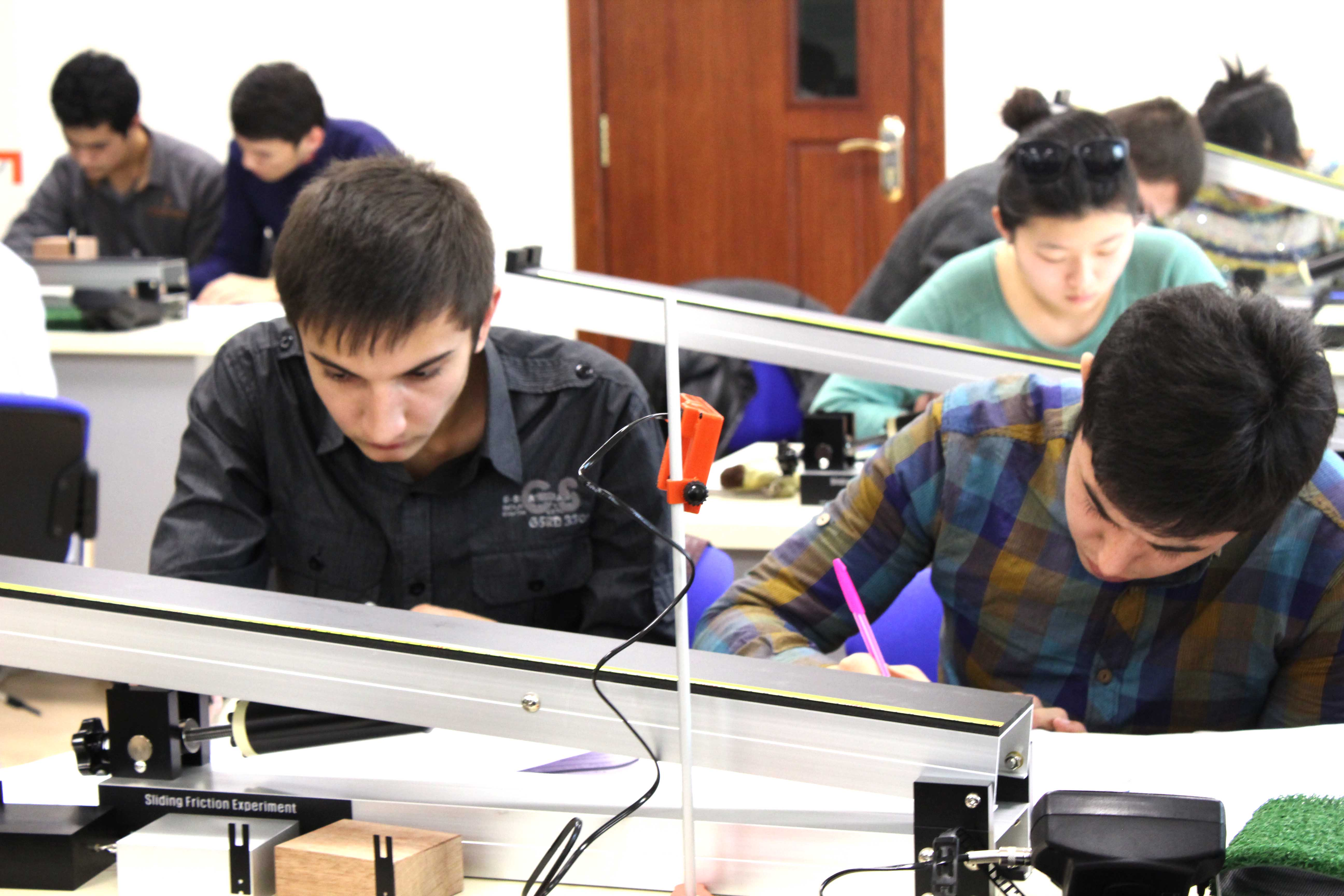
Physics Lab

The objective of the physics lab is to understand the basics of classical mechanics and thermal/statistical physics.

=== Data Center ===
The Data Center enables staff and students access to university data and information services.

== Innovations and Industry Cooperation Center ==
In January 2016 the IUT established Innovations and Industry Cooperation Center (IICC) with the aim of supporting research and innovation, strengthening of conditions for professional skills development of students, and technology transfer, as well as incubation of startups. IICC has established IUTLab, where undergraduate students can engage in web and mobile development and provide various IT-services to customers.

== Vision Center ==
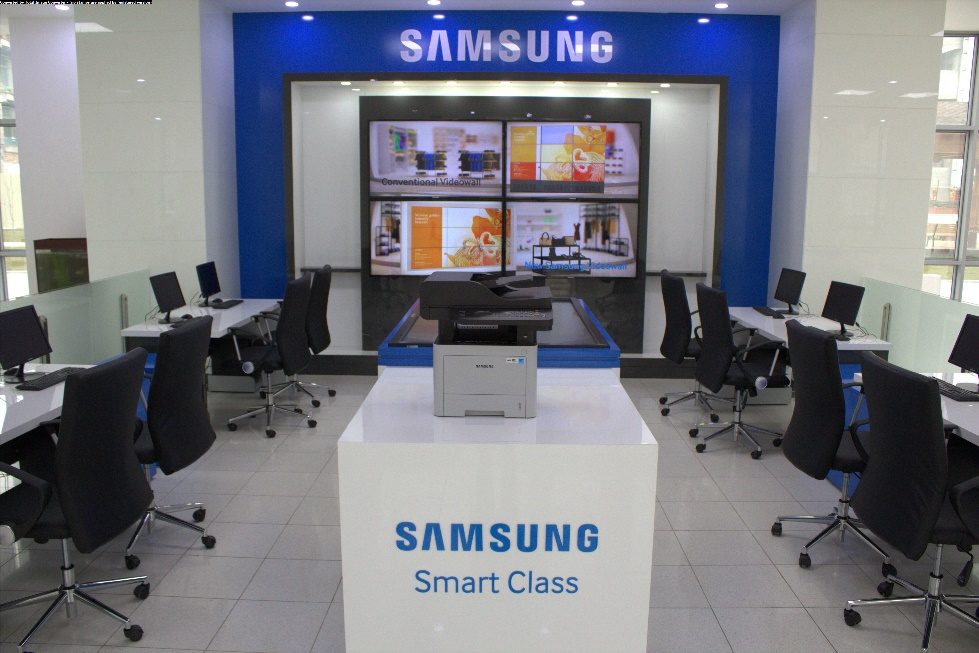
Smart Class

As IUT maintains open doors policy and visitors can enter premises freely, several companies have established information stands in the lobby of the main building of IUT. This gives a chance for companies to present their latest technologies to the wider public. Samsung, KT, and SAP have already established their permanent exhibition stands in the Vision Center, while Microsoft, Hanjin Group, and Korean Air are currently preparing them for initiation. Samsung Smart Class includes application location, curriculum planning, learning management systems and mapping question banks on a tablet. Also, the stand includes the multi-display videowall solution and interactive e-board.

== See also ==
- TEAM University
- Inha University
- Turin Polytechnic University in Tashkent
- Tashkent State Technical University
- Tashkent Institute of Irrigation and Melioration
- Tashkent Financial Institute
- Moscow State University in Tashkent named M.V Lomonosov
- Tashkent Automobile and Road Construction Institute
- Tashkent State University of Economics
- Tashkent State Agrarian University
- Tashkent State University of Law
- Tashkent University of Information Technologies
- University of World Economy and Diplomacy
- Westminster International University in Tashkent
- Yeoju Technical Institute in Tashkent
