= Tashkent University of Information Technologies =

Coordinates: 41°20′27″N 69°17′12″E

Tashkent University of Information Technologies (TUIT)
- Type: Public
- Established: 1955
- President: Makhkamov Bakhtiyor
- Location: Tashkent, Uzbekistan
- Nickname: TATU(TUIT)
- Website: www.tuit.uz

Tashkent University of Information Technologies named after Muhammad ibn Musa al-Khwarizmi (Uzbek: Muhammad ibn Muso al-Xorazmiy nomidagi Toshkent axborot texnologiyalari universiteti, Russian: Ташкентский Университет Информационных Технологий) often abbreviated as ТАТU or TUIT is one of the largest universities in Uzbekistan, located in its capital Tashkent. Tashkent University of Information Technologies was in 1955 founded as Tashkent Electro Technical Institute of Communication and it was the major and only producer of communication engineers for the Central Asian region. Today, it is one of the major universities to nurture ICT talent in Uzbekistan. The university was named after Al-Khwarizmi by a presidential resolution to further boost its role within the nation and abroad.

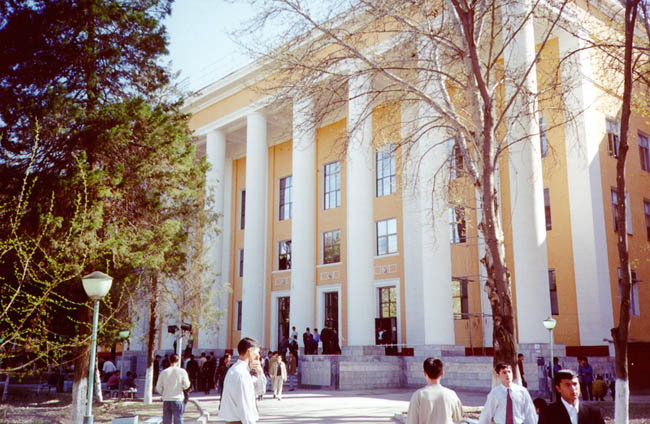
Tashkent University of Information Technologies named after Muhammad al-Khwarizmi.

== History ==
At the beginning, the institute was situated on the territory of the Tashkent Communication Polytechnic founded in 1930 (nowadays Tashkent Vocational College of Communication) and was functioning there until the beginning of the academic year 1961–1962. The duties of the head (rector) of the institute were temporarily entrusted to N. B. Matskevich, chief of the Technical School of Communication. In the first academic year, 150 students were admitted to the university only on one specialization: telephone and telegraph communication. So the telephone and telegraph communication (TTC) faculty and four united departments were established. The first graduation of engineers took place in 1960.

In the academic year of 1957–58 the radio and broadcasting faculty (RBF) was opened and the institute began training radio and broadcasting engineers. In 1957 general-technical departments were established to train students in such specializations as telephony, telegraphy, communication lines, telecommunication, and power supply of communication enterprises. Since 1960 such departments as theoretical fundamentals of radio engineering; radio receivers; radio transmitters; broadcasting and television and some others were established.

Since the academic year of 1964–65 on the base of TTC faculty the institute began to train students in two specializations: automatic telecommunication and multi-channel telecommunication. The TTC faculty was renamed the Automatic and Multi-Channel Telecommunication faculty (AMCTCF). In academic year 1969–1970 two independent faculties – Automatic Telecommunication (ATC) and Multi-Channel Telecommunication (MCTC) – were established. Since academic year 1964–65 some existing departments were reorganized or new ones established: the theory of linear electric network; the theory of signal transmission and the theory of nonlinear electric network; technical electrodynamics and antenna-feeder devices; measurements in communication engineering; automatic telecommunication; multi-channel telecommunication; transmission of discrete messages and telegraphy, etc.

In 1957, the institute opened night and correspondence departments with the following specializations: telephone and telegraph communication; radio and broadcasting. Since 1968 the institute has been paying particular attention to training working students — they introduced a new position of pro-rector for the night and correspondence departments.

Towards the end of the 1960s, the admittance of students to the daytime department was 400–450 persons; to the night and correspondence departments was 300 persons. Toward the second half of the 1970s, the number of daytime students came to 2000–2500 persons and night and correspondence students came to about 2000.

Since the end of the 1950s, some special departments began scientific researches on the basis of economic contracts. For example, the communication lines department made research to determine the specific electro-conductivity of the ground in Central Asia, the department of theoretical fundamentals of radio engineering investigated magnetostrictive sifters. The first research laboratories with independent staff of research officers were established at that time.

In the 1970s the institute reached the level of training engineers with education quality, which wasn't inferior to other graduates of the same institutes established earlier. The institute became one of the prestigious educational institutions of the Republic with rather big scientific potential and a large number of lecturers with academic status and degrees. At that time the institute began to carry out big state budget and contract researches on developing new means of communication and new ways of signal transmitting, receiving and handling. At the same time the institute researched other adjacent spheres of national economy.

In 1991 the university opened a post-graduate course on two specialties and a special academic council on defending PhD theses started. Nowadays this post-graduate course prepares highly qualified specialists in five professions.

Since 1993 a special military faculty has been functioning at the university. This faculty prepares communication officers mainly for troops of the Ministry of Defense and other power structures of the Republic Uzbekistan.

Since 1996 the Central Asian Telecommunication Training Center for raising the level of engineers' skills has been functioning at the university. This Center uses the grant TASIS TEMPUS under the program of the European Union Commission. About 100 lecturers and post-graduates raised the level of their skills in training centers of Belgium and Greece under this program. At the university there is also a center for training women in information and telecommunication technologies established by the Trade and Development Agency and, besides that, there are courses under the CISCO program (US). All the preparations are being made to organize the joint Uzbek–Indian Training Center of Information Technologies. The university has established close friendly and business relationships with many relative higher education institutions of the world.

Two lyceums are functioning under the patronage of the University: Boarding School Lyceum and Academic Lyceum, each of them trains about 200,250 students. The classrooms of the lyceums are equipped with sufficient computers, including computers connected to the Internet. The library fund of the university has over 300,000 books and it is constantly increasing and renovating. There is also an electronic library connected to the local network of the university and to the Internet.

The university has a house of students for 700 persons, which has all necessary conditions for living, relaxation and sports. According to the president's decree dated 30 May 2002, the Tashkent Electro Technical Institute of Communication was reorganized into Tashkent University of Information Technologies. The teaching staff got the instruction to fulfill their duties more properly and raise the level of education of Bachelors and Masters in information and computer technologies including information security and electronic commerce.

The Resolution of the Cabinet of Ministry of the Republic dated 2 June 2005 "About development of the staff training system in the sphere of information technologies" determined Tashkent University of Information Technologies as the main educational institution preparing specialists in the sphere of information and communication technologies. There has been made a decision to open regional branches of the University in Nukus, Karshi, Samarkand, Fergana and Urgench.

== Health centers ==
The university has health centers in the country. One of them is in Hondailik village, Bustanlik district, Tashkent region, and the other is in Chinaz district on the shore of the Syrdarya River. The students and teaching staff can get medical and prophylactic help in the health center in the hospice.

The students from the regions are provided with a hospice and free dinners.

== Student life ==
The students have all necessary conditions for active study and interesting rest. The departments and research laboratories carry out research on the base of state budget, grants and economic contracts. There are regional branches of the university in such cities as Nukus, Karshi, Samarkand, Fergana and Urgench. These branches prepare Bachelors and Masters mainly in informatics and information technologies. At the university there is a center for raising the level of engineers' skills in the sphere of communication and information technologies, a center for training women to work at the enterprises in the sphere of information and telecommunication technologies, CISCO courses and other centers and courses. The library fund of the university has over 300,000 books and it is constantly increasing and renovating. There are also electronic libraries equipped with 40 computers and connected to the Internet.

== See also ==
- TEAM University Tashkent
- Turin Polytechnic University in Tashkent
- Inha University in Tashkent
- Yeoju Technical Institute in Tashkent
- Tashkent State Technical University
- Tashkent Institute of Irrigation and Melioration
- Tashkent Financial Institute
- Moscow State University in Tashkent named M.V Lomonosov
- Tashkent Automobile and Road Construction Institute
- Tashkent State University of Economics
- Tashkent State Agrarian University
- Tashkent State University of Law
- University of World Economy and Diplomacy
- Westminster International University in Tashkent
- Samarkand State Medical Institute
