= Tashkent Automobile and Road Construction Institute =

Tashkent Institute of Design, Construction and Maintenance of Automobile Roads
- Toshkent avtomobil yo'llarini loyihalash, qurish va ekspluatatsiyasi instituti
- Type: National
- Established: 21 December 1972
- Rector: Riskulov Alimjan Axmadjanovich
- Undergraduates: over 4000
- Location: Tashkent, Uzbekistan
- Language: Uzbek, Russian

The Tashkent Automobile and Road Construction Institute was established in Tashkent, Uzbekistan to meet the high demands for professionals in the transportation and automobile fields.

== About the Institute ==
The Tashkent Institute of Design, Construction and Maintenance of Automobile Roads (TIDCMAR) is an institute in Central Asia which focuses on training engineers on automobile and road construction fields. It was first established during Soviet times by the edict of Uzbek government number 697 on 27 December of the year 1971 and by the edict of "Ministry of Higher and Secondary Education Affairs" number 27 on 21 January of the year 1972 under the base of automobile-road faculty at "Tashkent Poly Technical Institute". The first academic year at the institute started on 1 September 1972.

TIDCMAR's main building is located in the center of Tashkent, near the metro station "Oybek" and next to the "State Museum of Arts" of Uzbekistan. Tashkent Institute of Design, Construction and Maintanace of Automobile Roads is well known as one of the leading universities in Central Asia in fields of automobile construction, automobile transport, road and airport construction. The campus of the institute is fully supplied with modern rooms to hold classes, rooms for experimental subjects and a techno park.

There are 3 academicians from "Uzbek Academy of Sciences", 4 representatives of Uzbek sciences, 38 doctors of sciences, who give their lectures at the university.

There are four faculties at the university and till 2006 the Tashkent Automobile and Road Construction Institute had a special faculty for gifted students. However, nowadays this faculty is closed, meanwhile gifted students are having the chance of studying at the libraries and scientific centers under the institute's administration. Lectures at the institute are mainly given in Uzbek and Russian languages, but gifted students are given chance to have lectures in English language. There are 4000 students who enter the institute every year, to obtain their bachelor's and master's degrees.

The campus of the institute also consists of big library with the 400 thousand books, scientific and literal materials. TIDCMAR has its own polygraphing center and complex of dormitories. TIDCMAR has created big scientific schools for its students which are created by the representative of science in Uzbekistan.

The main role in development of the TIDCMAR plays cooperation with many international universities, local and global corporations. 450 successful graduates from TARCI, who graduated from TIDCMAR between 1978 and 2004, are currently employed in 25 foreign countries.

Nowadays, TIDCMAR is training specialists in 11 branches of bachelor's degree and 17 branches for master's degree. 57 percent of all the teachers at institute have their scientific degrees.

== Faculties ==
There are 2 big faculties currently acting at TIDCMAR and they are: "Automobile Roads and Artificial structures faculty", "Maintenance of road building machines and automobile transport Faculty". All of the faculties are based on automobile and road constructing.

=== Transport and Transport Communications Control Faculty ===
The main goal of the transport and transport communications faculty is covering high local demands for professionals on transports field. The dean of the faculty is Yuldasheva Saodat Arslanovna.

=== Road Construction Faculty ===
The history of this faculty is linked with the history of the institute, as it was created simultaneously with the TARCI in 1972. The head of the faculty was docent S.X. Xusnitdinov, who controlled the faculty till the year of 1979. In the first years there were 4 departments in the faculty, which were "Automobile Roads Planning", "Exploitation of Automobile Roads", "Road Constructing Materials", "Road Constructing Machines". When it was established there were 117 students engaged with the studies.

In 1979 it was renamed to "Road Construction Faculty". 1972–86 there were 7 departments, 1987–95 there were 12–14 departments, 1995–2000 there were 7 departments and currently there are 4 departments at the faculty. Currently, the dean of "Road Construction Faculty" is Salimova Barno Jamalovna.

=== Automobile Transport Exploitation Faculty ===
The Automobile Transport Exploitation Faculty is the oldest faculty of the institute, it was created even before the TARCI in 1943, under the "Central Asian Industrial Institute", which is now Tashkent State Technical University. However, initially it was established as the department in Mechanics Faculty and was called "Automobiles". First head of the department was G.A. Kuzminov.

On the base of this department "Automobile Roads" faculty was established in 1969. After creation of TARCI 1972 the faculty was given to the institute and was renamed to its current name, which is "Automobile Transport Exploitation Faculty". Nowadays the dean of the faculty is Xakimov Ravshan Muminovich.

The seven departments in the faculty are:

1. Technical exploitation of automobiles
2. Heat technology and auto engines
3. Safety
4. Transporting by automobiles
5. Creating of movement safety
6. Electro mechanics and automation
7. History

Graduates are currently working at the big automobile concerns and holding of Republic Uzbekistan in leading positions. Graduates from the faculty may also work at automobile factories, in auto transport and auto repairing companies and at many other companies which are mainly focus on automobiles.

=== Auto Mechanics Faculty ===
The Auto Mechanics Faculty is the youngest faculty of TARCI. It was established in 1993 after opening of automobile industry in Republic Uzbekistan with the name of "Automobile utilization". During the years of 1993 to 1995 it was controlled by docent D.R. Kulmuhamedov. However, interest among the applicants decreased rapidly and in order to save the faculty it was mixed with the faculty of "Automobile Transports" in 1995 and was renamed as "Automobile Industry". After 3 years it was reset in 1998 at the "Auto Mechanics Faculty".

There are 6 departments located in the faculty, and they are:

1. Automobiles
2. Automobile technology
3. Road constructing machines
4. Geometry
5. Fundamentals of machine planning
6. Philosophy

The faculty cooperates with some local and international universities which are: "Moscow Automobile Roads Institute", "Transport Academy of Kyrgyzstan", "Tashkent State Technical University" and many others. It also cooperates with some local companies, in order to supply the graduates with jobs after finishing the institute. These are: "Uzavtosanoat", "Uzavtoyo'l", "Uzavtoremont" and others.

Currently the dean of the "Auto Mechanics Faculty" is Hikmatov Shukhrat Ismatovich.

== Departments ==
There are 4 main departments at the TARCI, which have their own sub-departments.

The main departments of the institute are listed below:

1. Technical Exploitation of Automobiles
2. Uzbek and Russian Languages
3. Automobiles and Specialized Transports
4. Informatics and Information Technologies

== International affairs ==
University pays much attention on planning and operating the meetings with many international universities from developed countries, in order to call the highly qualified specialists to Uzbekistan to teach Uzbek students. Nowadays, the institute has many contracts with a number of developed countries of the world. For instance, South Korea, China, Germany, Latvia, Russia, US, Japan, Belarus, Poland, Malaysia and Indonesia.

=== French universities delegation ===
On 30 September 2015 TIDCMAR received a delegation from French universities. The main guest was from the French University called "Reseau n+I 60 engineering university", who was the head of that university called Jan-Pier Trotinyon. During the meeting Mr. Trotinyon gave presentation in English language at the Qualification Center of the TARCI.

The guests from France have also visited the official museum of TARCI and discussed the two-side cooperation issues.

== Mechatronics ==
TIDCMAR is one of the partners of "Mechatronics" project. The main goal of the project is to produce a new generation of engineers who are capable of performing constructive engineering works in the Mechatronics field meeting today's and tomorrow's technology challenges.

=== Partners ===
EU partners:

- KTH Royal Institute of Technology – Sweden, grand holder
- KU Leuven – Belgium
- Johannes Kepler University Linz – Austria

Uzbek project partners:

- Tashkent Automobile and Road Construction Institute – national/academic project coordinator
- Bukhara Engineering Technological Institute
- Fergana Polytechnic Institute
- Navoi State Mining Institute
- Turin Polytechnic University in Tashkent

Uzbek industry partners:

- Navoi Heat Power Plant
- Navoi Machinery-building Plant
- JV "UZSUNGWOO" LLC
- UAB "Eurasia TAPO-Disk"
- Joint Venture "General Motors Powertrain Uzbekistan"
- SC "Uzavtosanoat"
- Ministry of Higher and Secondary Specialized Education
- Scientific-technical park "Computer-Asia"

== Rectorate ==
Nowadays, the head of the "Maintenance of road building machines.and automobile transport " is doctor of technical sciences Riskulov Alimjan Axmadjanovich.

== Location ==
The exact location of the "Tashkent Automobile and Road Construction Institute" is Republic Uzbekistan, Tashkent City, 100060, Amir Timur Street, House 20.

== See also ==
- TEAM University Tashkent
- Turin Polytechnic University in Tashkent
- Inha University in Tashkent
- Tashkent State Technical University
- Tashkent Institute of Irrigation and Melioration
- Tashkent Financial Institute
- Moscow State University in Tashkent named M.V Lomonosov
- Management Development Institute of Singapore in Tashkent
- Tashkent State University of Economics
- Tashkent State Agrarian University
- Tashkent State University of Law
- Tashkent University of Information Technologies
- University of World Economy and Diplomacy
- Westminster International University in Tashkent
