= Turin Polytechnic University in Tashkent =

University in Uzbekistan

- Toshkent shahridagi Turin politexnika universiteti (TTPU)
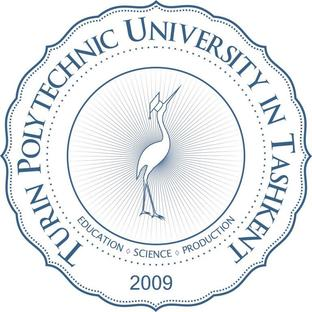

Location
- 17, Kichik khalqa yuli street, 100095, Tashkent, Uzbekistan; 41°21′06″N 69°13′19″E

Information
- School type: Non-governmental, non-commercial higher educational institution
- Established: April 27, 2009
- Rector: Dr. Olimjon Tuychiev
- Enrollment: 1525 (2020)
- International students: 22 (2020)
- Language: English
- Color: Blue
- Website: https://www.turin.uz

Turin Polytechnic University in Tashkent (Uzbek: Toshkent shahridagi Turin politexnika universiteti (TTPU)) is a non-profit public higher education institution in Uzbekistan. Turin Polytechnic University in Tashkent was established in 2009 in a partnership with the Polytechnic University of Turin, Italy. TTPU's main objective is to prepare specialists for the automotive, mechanical engineering, electrical industries and companies in the field of civil engineering and construction, and the power industry, in accordance with the educational programs adopted in collaboration with Polytechnic University of Turin, Italy.

TTPU has five departments: Department of Natural-Mathematical Sciences, Department of Humanitarian-Economy Sciences, Department of Control and Computer Engineering, Department of Civil Engineering and Architecture, and Department of Mechanical and Aerospace Engineering. TTPU is a teaching and research university.

== History ==
The official foundation date of the university is April 27, 2009, when the decree of the President of the Republic of Uzbekistan No. PP-1106 "On the organization of Turin Polytechnic University in Tashkent" was issued and from that date the university began its activity as a higher educational institution in accordance with the Educational Standards of the Republic of Uzbekistan.

In summer of 2009, the first 200 students were admitted for bachelor's degree program and the new university building with academic and administrative buildings and a modern campus was commissioned.

TTPU was established from the collaboration among Polytechnic University of Turin, UZAuto Motors (the leading car manufacturer in Uzbekistan), and the Uzbek Ministry of Higher Education.

The Cooperation Agreement and Double Degree Agreement was signed 2009 with the Polytechnic University of Turin (Italy) that developed three HE curricula in Engineering BS and MS in Uzbekistan in accordance with the Italian HE system and acknowledged from both, the Ministry of Higher and Secondary Education of Republic of Uzbekistan and the Italian legislation.

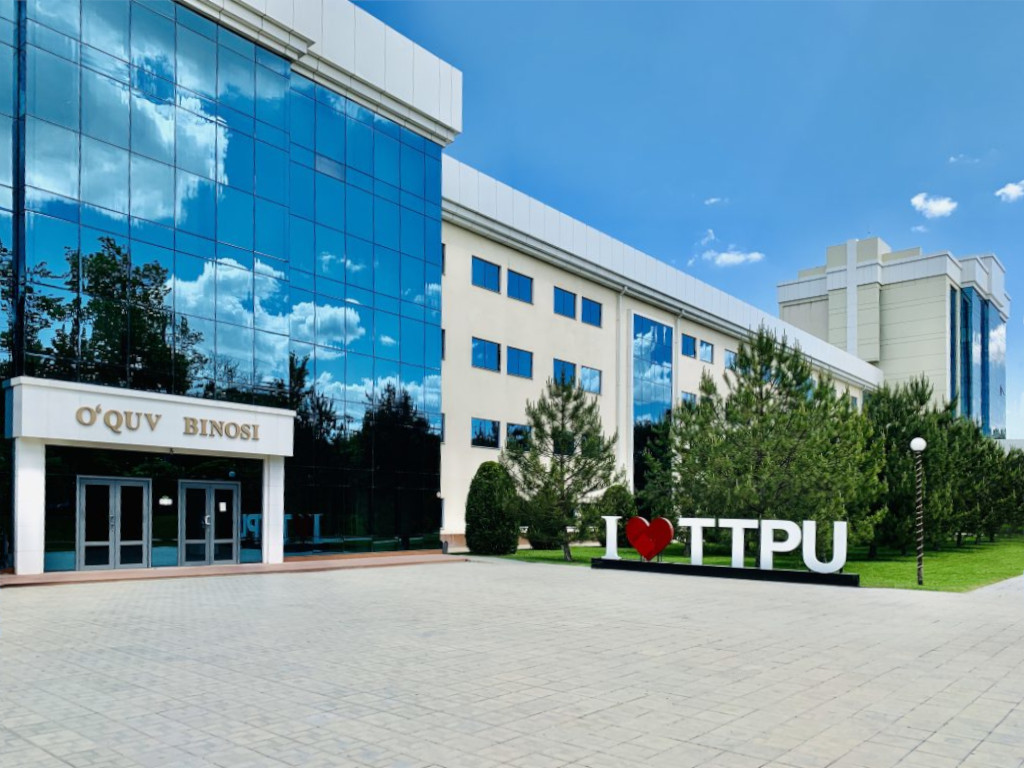
The main entrance to the academic building.

=== Expansion and growth ===
In May 2010, an academic lyceum was established under the university to prepare students hard sciences and the building of the academic lyceum with the capacity of 450 students was constructed and commissioned by September 2011. In the same year, a Metrology Center in cooperation with the Italian company Hexagon Metrology S.P.A., Mechatronics Center with the support of General Motors Powertrain JSC and the German company Festo and CAD / CAM / CAE Center were established at the university.

In 2014, the MAN training center was organized in cooperation with MAN Truck & Bus and JV MAN Auto-UZBEKISTAN LLC JV.

In 2015, admission for the master's degree program in the specialty direction of "Mechatronics" was organized in the university. In 2016, the university became one of the first higher education institutions in the field of technology to receive a certificate of ISO 9001: 2008 International Quality Standard for services in the field of education.

In 2019, the undergraduate program for obtaining a double degree diploma "2+2" was organized in cooperation with the Andijan Machine building Institute.

In November 2020, the undergraduate program with a double degree diploma "2+2" was developed in cooperation with Turin Polytechnic University in Tashkent and Pittsburg State University, Kansas, the United States of America.

== Campus ==
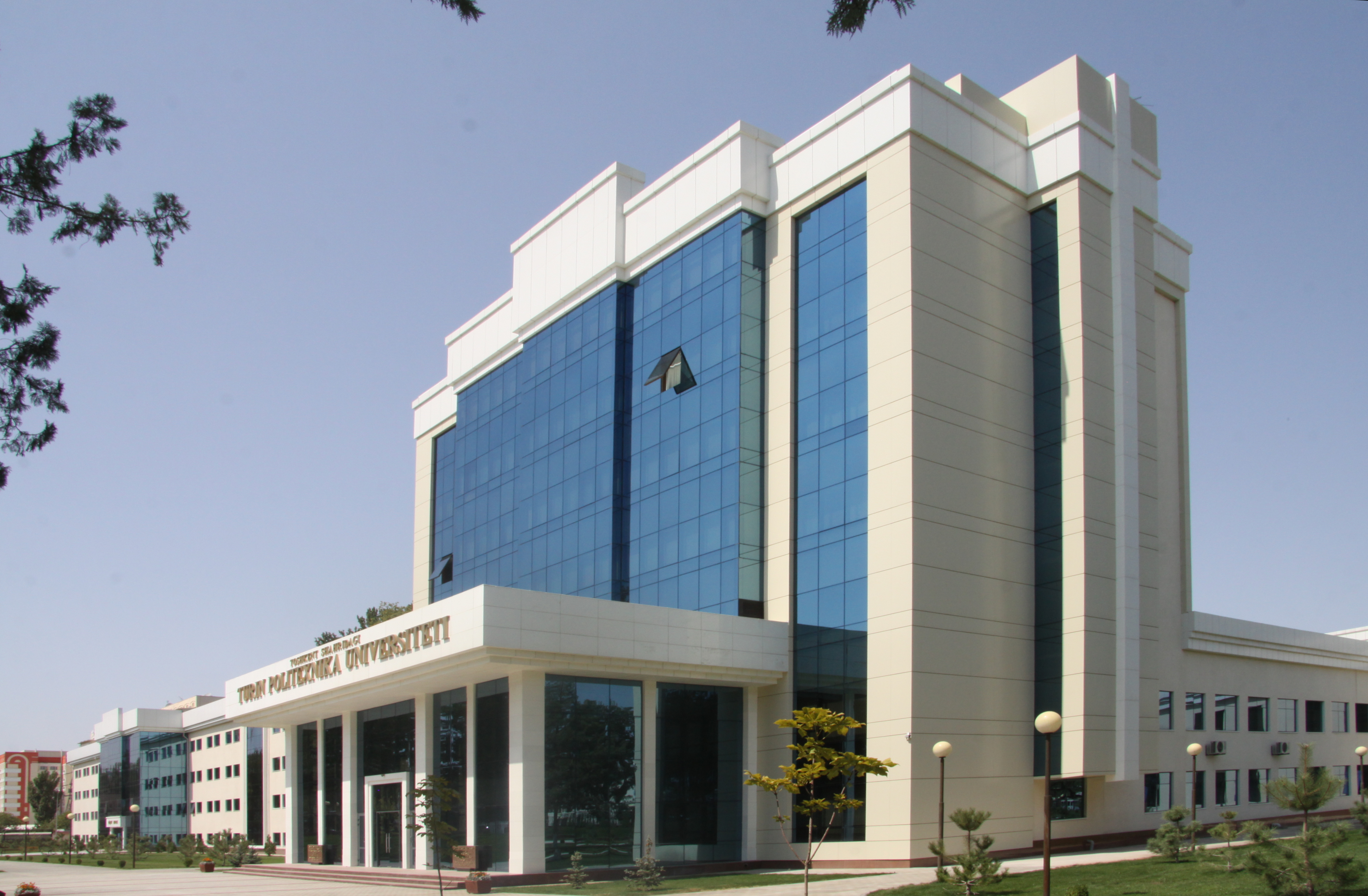
Turin Polytechnic University in Tashkent, 2011

The campus is located in Tashkent, Uzbekistan, with modern educational and administrative buildings, conference halls, library, sport complex, research centers, residence hall, dormitories for professors and the large soccer stadium. The campus is under 24/7 security watch, has the Information Resource Center and the cafeteria.

Moreover, the university territory includes Academic and Administrative buildings, Specialized laboratory, Technopark and Metrology center. There are also Academic Lyceum, Mechatronics Center, MAN Academy, CAD / CAM / CAE Center and CLAAS Center under the authority of the university.

== Education ==
The period of study for students to obtain an educational qualification degree is 4 years for Bachelor's and 2 years for master's degree. Students are taught in English language with the involvement of professors and teachers of the Polytechnic University of Turin.

Turin Polytechnic University in Tashkent offers the following courses:

- Bachelor's degree program in Mechanical and Aerospace Engineering
- Bachelor's degree program in Information Technology and Automation Systems in Industry (ICT)
- Bachelor's degree program in Industrial and Civil Engineering and Architecture
- Master's degree program in Mechatronic Engineering
- PhD
- Preparatory Programs
- Short-term internships

The core engineering courses are mainly taught by Italian professors and local professors who were educated in Italy, Japan, South Korea and the United States.

TTPU's Bachelor's and master's degree programs are based on POLITO academic program and are offered at Turin Polytechnic University in Tashkent with a “mixed” approach. That is, some courses are delivered by POLITO faculty members; others, by TTPU faculty members previously trained by teachers from Polytechnic University of Turin.

In accordance with the signed Agreement between the Universities for the awarding of diplomas, graduates receive an Italian diploma of the Polytechnic University of Turin.

== Activities ==
TTPU organizes many activities and closely cooperate with major, local and foreign companies across Uzbekistan. Moreover, it runs several international projects on education and development.

=== Scientific activity ===
TTPU runs many fundamental, innovative and practical projects and conducts educational, methodological and researches under foreign grants. Students actively participate in international science competitions. The number and the quality of scientific articles have increased; great attention is paid to the publication of scientific collections and monographs, as well as, the patenting and implementation of scientific developments. In particular, the publication of articles by doctoral students engaged in doctoral dissertations, including in prestigious foreign journals, in the web journals of Science and Scopus that is gaining momentum.

Turin Polytechnic University in Tashkent was awarded the Scopus Award-2018 in nomination "The best scientists of the year" (DilshodTulaganov) and The Scopus Award-2019 in nomination "The impact of the year."

=== Sport activities ===
Regularly, TTPU's sport teams participate in sport activities in soccer, basketball, volleyball, table tennis, wrestling, chess, athletics and swimming competitions. Moreover, TTPU competes in collaboration with the participants from other universities. Some sport competitions take place in Sport Complex and Stadium of the university.

=== Juventus Academy in Tashkent ===
A football academy "Juventus Academy in Tashkent," which is the official branch of Juventus football Academy of Italy, was established at TTPU's campus in 2019.

=== Partners ===
TTPU closely cooperates with European, American and Asian higher education institutions and companies and with more than 40 universities from more than 19 countries. Moreover, the university has developed many international projects funded by the European Union's Erasmus + capacity building program.

== See also ==
- TEAM University Tashkent
- Tashkent State Technical University
- Tashkent Institute of Irrigation and Melioration
- Tashkent Financial Institute
- Moscow State University in Tashkent named M.V Lomonosov
- Tashkent Automobile and Road Construction Institute
- Tashkent State University of Economics
- Tashkent State Agrarian University
- Tashkent State University of Law
- Tashkent University of Information Technologies
- University of World Economy and Diplomacy
- Universities in the United Kingdom
- Education in England
- Education in Uzbekistan
- Tashkent
