= Tashkent Institute of Finance =

Coordinates: 41°19′26.8″N 69°16′59.2″E

- Toshkent Moliya Instituti; Ташкентский Финансовый институт
- Type: Public
- Established: 1931
- Undergraduates: > 10,000
- Location: Tashkent, Uzbekistan
- Campus: Urban
- Website: https://tfi.uz/en

Tashkent Institute of Finance, also known as Tashkent Financial Institute (Uzbek: Toshkent moliya instituti) was one of the leading universities in Uzbekistan, established in 1991, later, in 2024 it was merged into Tashkent State University of Economics. It was located in the center of Tashkent.

Tashkent Institute of Finance offerred:

- Pre-university programs include finance and tax lyceums, a bank college,
- Bachelor's degree with majors including Finance, Banking, and Valuation
- Master's degree
- PhD programs

The programs were provided in Uzbek, Russian and English. An "E-university" system is established. Moreover, the institute provided students with sports and social activities.

== History ==
The institute was founded in 1931, as the Central Asian Financial-Economical Institution. Later it was renamed as the Tashkent Financial-Economical Institution. In 1962 its name was changed to Tashkent State Economical University.

After Uzbekistan gained independence, the university became the Tashkent Financial Institute within the Tashkent State Economical University on May 13, 1991.

Thereafter the Institute taught more than 13,500 professionals.

== Strategies for development ==
The institute's plans include:

- Pay attention to gifted and eager students and supply everything necessary for them to succeed
- Develop the qualifications and knowledge of professors and teachers
- Improve the textbooks and develop new materials
- Reinforce the relations with the universities from developed countries. Make the university equal to the international universities
- Attract international investors to develop the university
- Work with the National Academy of Uzbekistan, with Uzbeki central and commercial banks, the Ministry of Finance and other companies to better integrate theoretical and practical knowledge

== Faculties ==
Currently seven working faculties operate at the Tashkent Institute of Finance:

- Financial management faculty
- Accounts and audit faculty
- Credit-economy faculty
- Finance-economy faculty
- Insurance faculty
- Budget accounts and state funds faculty
- Magistracy branch

The faculties include 26 departments.

More than 350 professors and teachers work there. The university assists teachers to enhance their practical knowledge by giving qualification training.

=== Financial management ===
The Financial Management faculty opened in 2004 under the name of "Management". In 2011 the faculty took its current name. From 2003 to 2010, F. Karimov was the leader of the faculty. From 2010 to 2012 F. Babashev controlled the faculty. From 2012 O. Astanakulov became the dean.

The faculty consists of four departments:

- Management and marketing
- Financial management
- Professional education
- Uzbek and Russian languages

Location: Uzbekistan, Tashkent, Kichikhalqa road – 7 house

=== Accounts and audit ===
The Accounts and audit faculty was established in 1946 under the Leningrad Institute. In the first year 54 students graduated. The first major was Statistics, starting in 1948. Later majors include Accounts in State bank (1955), Accounts in agriculture (1952) and Accounts and economical changes in transport corporations (1964). From 1980, Controlling became a major. After Independence the faculty obtained its current name. Graduates are work in corporations and state companies. In 1990 Republican Accountants and Auditors Union was established. As of 2017 the dean was Karimova Komila Doniyorovna.

Location: A.Temur street 60A

=== Credit-economy ===
This faculty opened in 1946 under the name of "Credit economy" and "Finance-economy". After Independence the Credit-economy faculty opened on June 1, 1991. As of 2017 the dean was N. Oblomurodov. The three departments are:

- Bank work
- Accounts and audit in banks
- Information and communication technologies

==== Facilities ====
- Conference hall (215 each) – 2 halls
- Study rooms (1000 total) – 33 rooms
- Computer classes (210 total) – 2 classes
- Language rooms – 3 rooms

Location: 10000, A. Temur street 60A

=== Finance-economics ===
This is the institute's biggest faculty. It opened in 1946. Its current name came following Independence. It includes four departments. As of 2017 the dean was R. D. Rustamovich.

The faculty partners with international universities. Professors and teachers regularly attend training abroad, in universities such as Texas A&M, Ritsumeikan, Asian Pacific Ocean University, University of Stirling, Moscow Finance Academy, Moscow State University, St. Petersburg Economic and Finance, University of Mannheim, University of Passau, Hamburg University of Information Technologiy, Universiti Teknologi MARA, and Indian Financial University.

Location: A. Temur 60A

=== Insurance ===
The Insurance faculty opened in 2005 under the name of Tax and insurance work. In 2011 it obtained its current name. This faculty co-operates with international universities. Its three departments are:

- Tax
- Insurance
- Philosophy and theory of building a democratic nation

As of 2017 the dean was R. U. Ablakulovich.

Location: Kichikxalqa road 7 house

=== Budget accounts and state funds ===
The Budget accounts and state funds faculty opened in 2004 as the Universal economy. On 29 January 2010 the faculty obtained its current name. As of 2017 the dean K. J. Imomboevich. The five departments in this faculty are:

- Pensions
- Investments
- Budgets
- Business
- Physical education and sport

Location: A.Temur street 60A

=== Magistracy branch ===
The Magistracy branch was established to provide prospective students with the chance to undertake postgraduate programs. The branch consists of two courses, and in 2012 it enrolled 866 students (508 from course one, 358 from course 2). As of 2016 the dean was A. U. Davlatovich. The 14 departments are:

- Finance
- Theory of economy
- Bank work
- Accounts and audit in banks
- Accounting
- Audit
- Financial analysis
- Statistics
- Financial management
- Budget counting
- Exchequer work
- Financial market and money
- Investments
- Insurance

Location: Tashkent

== Dormitories ==
The institute offers three dormitories. Dorm rooms house 2-3 students. Each stage has restrooms, kitchens and study halls. It hosts the sport hall with modern equipment. Each dormitory offers 11 newspapers and magazines.

=== Dormitory 1 ===
Dormitory 1 is on A. Xidoyatov street. This dormitory consists of four stories and houses 235 students. As of 2017 the director was Sh. Qodirova.

=== Dormitory 2 ===
Dormitory 2 is on Chimboy street. This dormitory has four stages with 175 places. As of 2017 its director was Q. Bekimbetov.

=== Dormitory 3 ===
Dormitory is on Osiyo street 1-house. It has nine levels housing 193 students. As off 2017 its director was N. Axunjanova.

== Recognition ==
Tashkent Financial Institute was ranked with the 9th position as the best masters ranking in economics (2013-2014).

== See also ==
- TEAM University Tashkent
- Turin Polytechnic University in Tashkent
- Inha University in Tashkent
- Tashkent State Technical University
- Tashkent Institute of Irrigation and Melioration
- Tashkent Automobile and Road Construction Institute
- Management Development Institute of Singapore in Tashkent
- Tashkent State University of Economics
- Tashkent State Agrarian University
- Tashkent State University of Law
- Tashkent University of Information Technologies
- University of World Economy and Diplomacy
- Westminster International University in Tashkent
