= University of World Economy and Diplomacy =

Public university in Tashkent, Uzbekistan

Coordinates: 41°19′26″N 69°19′11″E

University of World Economy and Diplomacy (UWED)
- Jahon iqtisodiyoti va diplomatiya universiteti
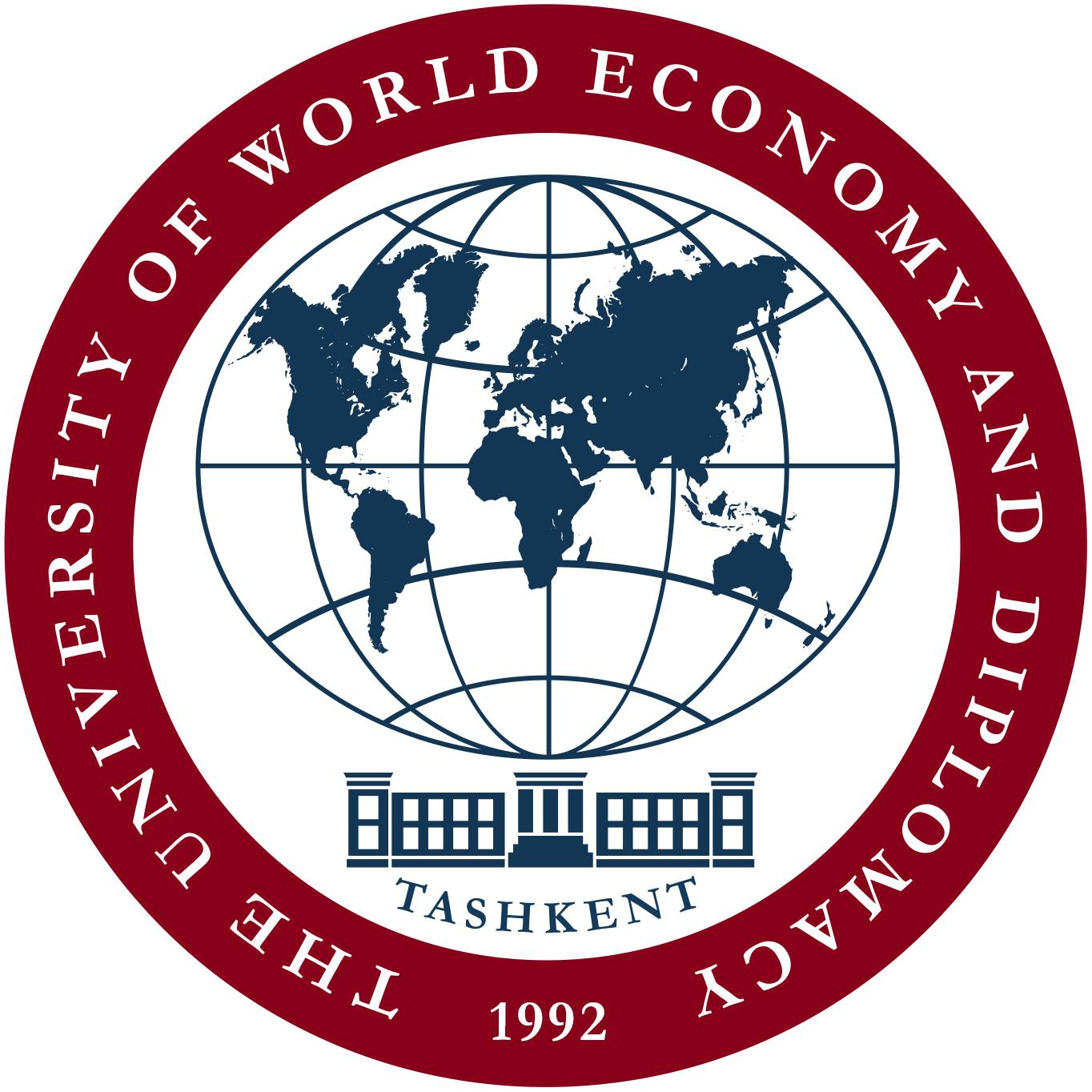
- Type: Public
- Established: 1992
- Rector: Sodiq Safoyev
- Location: (Uzbekistan) Tashkent, Uzbekistan
- Website: http://www.uwed.uz

The University of World Economy and Diplomacy is located in Tashkent, the capital of Uzbekistan. It was founded on September 23, 1992, by the decree of the President Karimov to train future leaders of the country. It is a public institution which is affiliated with Uzbekistan's Ministry of Foreign Affairs. It aims to provide higher education which serves the interests of the foreign policy of Uzbekistan and contributes to the development of society and the individual. The university has a strong alumni network.

The university hosts the Institute for Advanced International Studies, an independent, non-profit research institute.

== Academics ==
UWED offers four-year undergraduate degree programmes, two-year master's degree programmes, executive education programmes, as well as PhD programmes in selected fields.

Bachelor's degree programmes:

- International Relations
- Political Science
- World Economy and International Economic Relations
- International Law

Master's degree programmes:

- International Law
- Foreign Economic Activity
- International Economics and Management
- International Business Law
- Applied Political science
- International Relations and World Politics
- Public Governance

Currently, the university is organized into 11 departments:

- Department of English language
- Department of Oriental languages
- Department of Uzbek and Russian languages
- Department of European and Turkic languages
- Department of Civil Law and Private International Law
- Department of International Law and Public Law Sciences
- Department of International Finance and Investments
- Department of International Economy
- Department of Systematic Analysis and Mathematical Modeling
- Department of International Relations
- Department of Political Science

The training on the subjects of international relations, political science, global economy, and law is conducted by three departments, 22 chair departments, and eight centers and is given by 16 full professors, more than 70 holders of Doctor or Candidate of Sciences degrees, 55 associate professors and 87 qualified faculty members. Faculties for bachelor's degrees are International Economy, International Relations, Political Science, and International law.

The University have international partnerships and cooperation agreements with universities and institutes in: Japan, South Korea, China, Russia, Azerbaijan, Belgium, France, Germany, Hungary, Italy, Kazakhstan, Lithuania, Spain, Poland, Switzerland, Tajikistan, Turkiye, Turkmenistan, Ukraine, United Kingdom, United States.

== Sources ==
Faculty training

== See also ==
- TEAM University
- Turin Polytechnic University in Tashkent
- Inha University in Tashkent
- Yeoju Technical Institute in Tashkent
- Tashkent State Technical University
- Tashkent Institute of Irrigation and Melioration
- Tashkent Financial Institute
- Moscow State University in Tashkent named M.V Lomonosov
- Tashkent Automobile and Road Construction Institute
- Tashkent State University of Economics
- Tashkent State Agrarian University
- Tashkent State University of Law
- Tashkent University of Information Technologies
- Westminster International University in Tashkent
