= Tashkent Institute of Irrigation and Agricultural Mechanization Engineers =

University in Tashkent, Uzbekistan

"TIIAME" National Research University
- Toshkent Irrigatsiya va Qishloq Xo‘jaligini Mexanizatsiyalash Muhandislari Instituti
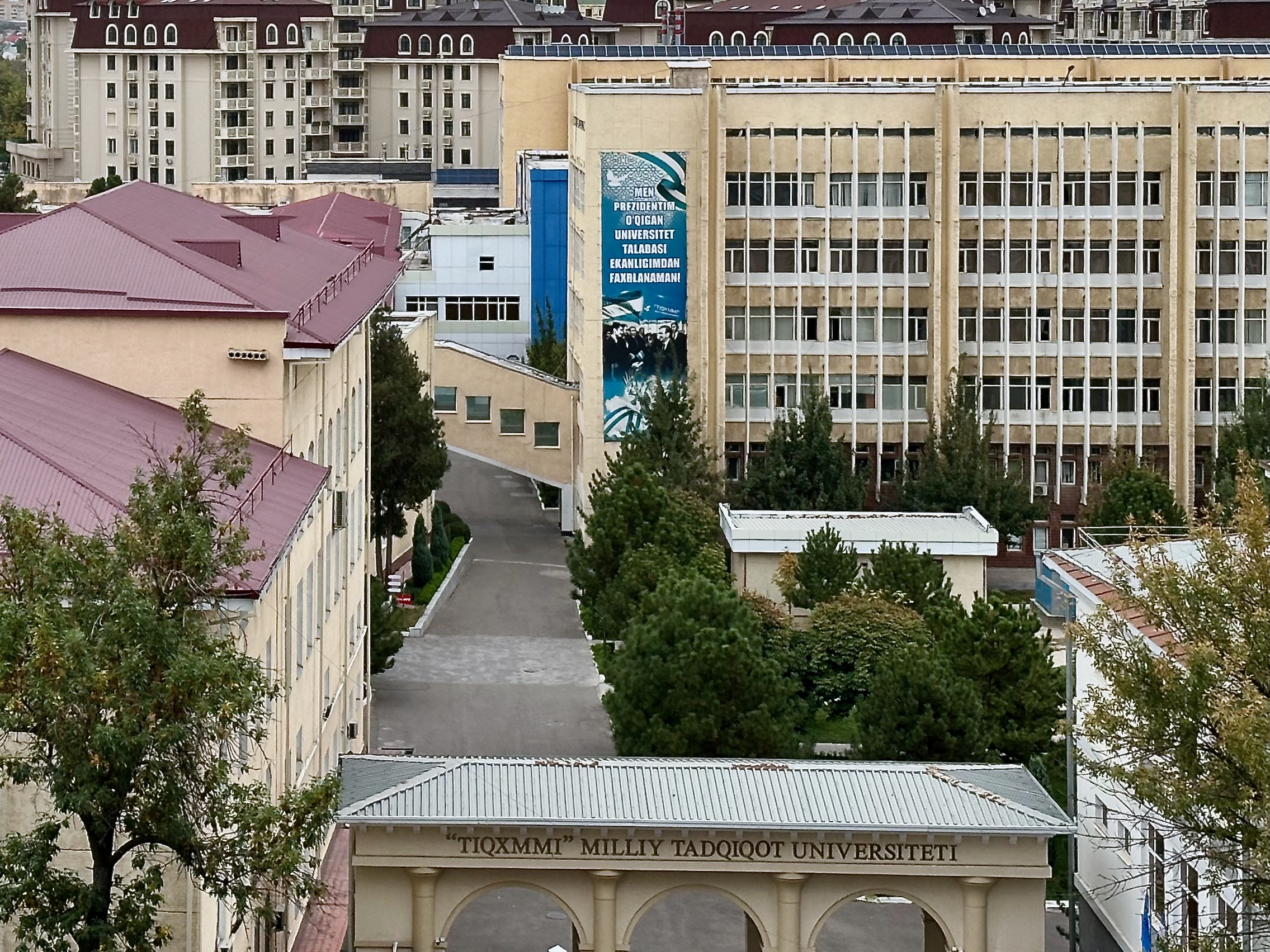
- Former names: Tashkent Institute of Irrigation and Melioration
- Type: Public
- Established: 1923
- Rector: Mirzayev Baxodir Suyunovich
- Location: Tashkent, Uzbekistan
- Language: Uzbek, Russian, English
- Website: tiiame.uz

University rankings

Regional – Overall
- QS Emerging Europe and Central Asia: 211-220 (2022)

Established in 1923, "TIIAME" National Research University (The Tashkent Institute of Irrigation and Agricultural Mechanization Engineers) is Uzbekistan's premier institution for engineering, agriculture, and environmental sciences. Designated as a national research university by Presidential Decree in 2021, TIIAME has evolved into a regional hub for academic excellence, technological innovation, and global scientific cooperation. With over 100 years of academic legacy, TIIAME plays a vital role in preparing highly qualified professionals and advancing research to address global challenges related to water, food, climate, Renewable Energy and sustainability. Tashkent Institute of Irrigation and Agricultural Mechanization Engineers is located in the Republic of Uzbekistan, Tashkent city, Kari Niyozov street, 39-house. TIIAME- National Research University ranked no. 1 university in Uzbekistan in national, QS and Times Higher Education World University Ranking. It is ranked 458th in the QS World University Rankings 2027 (Global), 103rd in the QS World University Rankings: Asia 2026, and ranked 501 in the Times Higher Education World University Rankings 2026. It holds the distinction of being the No. 1 university in Uzbekistan across all major national and international ranking platforms.

== History ==
The history of the Tashkent Institute of Irrigation and Agricultural Mechanization Engineers dates back to the Soviet Union. The university was first established in 1923 as the department of Turkistan State University. It was created under the technical faculty and was called Hydro Technical Engineering. In its first year of establishment, 24 agronomists and 16 water conservation specialists graduated from the faculty. The history of this university could be recognized on the second occasion. After six years of opening the Hydro Technical Engineering department, the government decided to establish a new department under the Melioration Engineering Faculty. Those two departments were linked together in 1929, which led to the establishment of Central Asian Cotton Irrigation Polytechnic University. On 11 November 1934, Central Asian Cotton Irrigation Polytechnic University was merged with the Central Asian Institute of Agricultural Industry Irrigation and Mechanization, which was the reason for the creation of the Tashkent Institute of Agricultural Industry Irrigation and Mechanization. In the first years of establishment, there were only two faculties, Hydromelioration and Mechanization. After World War II, the agricultural industry of the country increased rapidly, which affected the need for professional employees.

After World War II, a number of faculties were created: Building (1945), Mechanization of Hydro Melioration (1946), and Hydro Energetics (1946). In 1974 a new faculty was named Technology of Repairing Agricultural Industry Machines and Creating Them. In 1979 a number of engineering faculties were opened, which was directly linked to the economic growth in Uzbekistan.

After the independence of Uzbekistan, all the textbooks were interpreted into Uzbek language, and most of the classes started to be taught in the native language of Uzbekistan. In 2004, on 30 March by the edict of the Cabinet of Ministers of Uzbekistan, the institute obtained its current name. This meant that the Tashkent Institute of Agricultural Industry Irrigation and Mechanization was renamed to the Tashkent Institute of Irrigation and Melioration. In 2017 institute took the name Tashkent Institute of Irrigation and Agricultural Mechanization Engineers. Nowadays the institute involves five faculties with 30 departments. It has 353 professors and teachers and more than 4860 students.

== Campus ==
Tashkent Institute of Irrigation and Agricultural Mechanization Engineers consists of four main buildings, three laboratory buildings, scientific centers, an information resource center which has 700,000 materials in its fund, three dormitories with an overall capacity for 1200 students, a canteen which can serve 484 people at one time, and a park.

== Rector ==
The rector of Tashkent Institute of Irrigation and Agricultural Mechanization Engineers is Bakhadir Mirzaev Suyunovich, a doctor of Technical sciences and professor.

== Duties ==
Tashkent Institute of Irrigation and Agricultural Mechanization Engineers has set its duties and provided them in the rules of the institute. The six main duties are:

- Supply the individual (student) with intellectual and cultural education, and meet their ethical needs
- Help those individuals (students) to become improved by all of the sides
- To develop the subject by giving attention to volunteers who are creating something new relating to that subject
- To improve the qualification in the economy of interested people
- To keep the nation's ethic and cultural beliefs and enlarge them
- To spread the knowledge among the citizens

== Faculties ==
University rectorate building

National Research University "Tiiame" currently consists of seven faculties, which are divided into more than 40 departments. The seven faculties are as follows:

- Faculty of "Energy"
- Faculty of "Economics"
- Faculty of "Hydrotechnical construction"
- Faculty of "Ecology and Law"
- Faculty of "Agricultural Mechanization"
- Faculty of "Land Resources and Cadastre"
- Faculty of Hydromelioration

=== Faculty of Energy ===
The Faculty of Electrification and Automation of Agriculture was established in 1961, commencing its activities with the training of specialists in the field of agricultural electrification and the automation of technological processes. In 1978, the specialization in agricultural automation was separated into an independent faculty, which, three years later in 1981, was re-integrated into the Faculty of Electrification and Automation of Agriculture.

In 2004, the faculties of "Electrification and Automation of Agriculture" and "Mechanization of Irrigation and Reclamation Works" were merged, leading to the creation of the Faculty of Automation and Mechanization of Water Resources.

In 2017, based on Presidential Decree No. PQ-3003 dated 24 May 2017, the Faculty of Electrification and Automation of Agricultural and Water Management was reorganized at the Tashkent Institute of Irrigation and Agricultural Mechanization. This faculty incorporated relevant departments from the Tashkent State Agrarian University, along with undergraduate programs and master's specializations.

In 2018, following Presidential Resolution No. PQ-3702 dated 8 May 2018, aimed at fundamentally improving the system for training highly qualified specialists at the Tashkent Institute of Irrigation and Agricultural Mechanization, the faculty was renamed to "Energy Supply for Agricultural and Water Management."

In 2022, based on the decision of the President of the Republic of Uzbekistan No. PQ-3702 dated 10 December 2021, concerning the radical enhancement of the engineering workforce training system for economic sectors through innovation and digitalization, the Tashkent Institute of Irrigation and Agricultural Mechanization was transformed into a university and renamed "Tashkent Institute of Irrigation and Agricultural Mechanization Engineers" of the National Research University. Consequently, the faculty was renamed to "Energy."

There are four departments in faculty of Energy:

- Electricity and renewable energy sources
- Electrical technologies and operation of electrical equipment
- Electrical Engineering and Mechatronics
- Automation and control of technology process"

=== Faculty of Economics ===
In 1974, the Department of "Economy of Water Management and its Organization" was opened at the "Hydraulic Constructions" Faculty of the Tashkent Institute of Irrigation and Agricultural Mechanization Engineers. In 1976, this department was turned into an independent faculty.

Since 2004, the faculty has been operating under the name of "Water management and its economy", since 2015, under the name of "Management in water resources". According to the decision of the President of the Republic of Uzbekistan dated 24 May 2017 No.-3003 "Measures for the fundamental improvement of the system of engineering and technical personnel training for the agriculture and water management sectors" the faculty was named as "Organization and management of water resources" and has been operating under this name.

Based on the Decision of the President of the Republic of Uzbekistan dated 10.12.2021 No.-42 "On measures to fundamentally improve the system of training engineers for economic sectors based on innovation and digitization", it was renamed as "Economics" faculty within "Tashkent Institute of Irrigation and Agricultural Mechanization Engineers" National Research University from 1 February 2023, and modern educational and scientific-laboratory rooms, educational and scientific, advanced pedagogical activities of highly qualified pedagogic staff are performing their activities effectively.

The departments attached to the faculty consist of the following:

- Department of Economics
- Department of Information Technologies
- Department of Uzbek language and literature
- Department of English
- Department Accounting and auditing

=== Faculty of Hydrotechnical Constructions ===
In 1946, the Faculty of "Construction of Small and Medium Hydropower stations" was established on the initiative of the first female irrigator, T.A. Kolpakova, Later, the faculty continued its activities under the names "Hydraulic engineering", "River hydraulic structures and construction of hydroelectric power plants". After the organizational and structural transformations of the Institute, personnel training in the specialty "Water Management Construction" has been conducted since 1991 by the "Educational and Scientific Center for the Training of Irrigation Engineers", and since 1996 as part of the Faculty of "Hydro-Reclamation". In 2004, the Faculty of "Construction and Operation of hydraulic structures" was organized. According to the resolution of the Cabinet of Ministers of the Republic of Uzbekistan dated 3.11.2015 "On measures to improve the training and provision of the agricultural and water management system with highly qualified personnel", according to Resolution 311, the faculty "Construction and Operation of hydraulic structures" carried out its activities. According to the Decree of the President of the Republic of Uzbekistan dated 05/24/2017 No. PP–3003 "On measures to radically improve the system of training engineering and technical personnel for agriculture and water management", the Faculty of "Construction and Operation of Hydraulic Structures" was renamed the Faculty of " Hydrotechnical construction" as part of the Tashkent Institute of Agricultural Irrigation and Reclamation Engineers. For almost 73 years of activity, the faculty has trained more than 6,000 qualified specialists in the field of water management and energy and more than 100 specialists for foreign countries for the national economy of the Republic of Uzbekistan and the former Soviet republics. Graduates of the faculty completed practical training in the construction of Sayano-Shushenskaya, Bratsk, Toktogul, Nurek, Ust-Ilimskaya, Chorvakskaya hydroelectric power plants, Andijan, Talimardzhan, Gissarak reservoirs, Tuya-Muyunsky, Tupalangsky hydroelectric power plants. Currently, graduates of the faculty work in the construction of water management and energy facilities, in the operation of large hydraulic structures, hydropower facilities, in basin departments of irrigation systems, in organizations of water management construction, in regional departments of pumping stations, energy and communications.

The departments attached to the faculty consist of the following:

- The department "Hydraulic facilities and engineering structures"
- The department "Mechanics and computer simulation"
- The department "Engineering Graphics and design theory"
- The department "Pumping Stations and Hydroelectric Power Plants"
- The department "Construction Organization and Technology"

=== Faculty of Ecology and Law ===
In recent years in our republic the priority of importance is given to training of engineers who have certain skills in environmental protection, effective use of limited water reserves and land resources, mitigating the negative consequences of climate change, restoration of the biofund of agricultural land, reuse of saline and eroded areas, and biodiversity of ecosystems, expand investments and scientific research to solve global problems such as conservation, "green energy" and agro-technologies, creation of legal mechanisms for the use of transboundary water resources, raise the scientific potential to a new level through the widespread introduction of digital technologies, and ability to apply the developments into practice.

Faculty of "Ecology and Law" was established on decision of the President of the Republic of Uzbekistan PQ-42 10 December 2021 "On measures to fundamentally improvement the system of engineering personnel training for economic sectors based on innovation and digitization", on the bases of the meeting of the university's Board of Directors on 30 December 2022 based on the tasks defined in the statement No. 3 dated 10 June 2022.

There are "Ecology and Water Resources Management", "Digital Technologies and Artificial Intelligence", "Teaching Theory and Methodology" and "Humanities", "Physical Education and Sports" departments in the faculty. Faculty prepares competitive specialists in the field of ecology and environmental protection, water supply engineering systems, jurisprudence (land relations and transboundary water issues), artificial intelligence, software engineering and philology.

The faculty team is conducting a scientific research in field of ecology and environmental protection, negative effects of climate change on the environment and scientific justification of optimal solutions, waste management, rational use of water resources and their protection, basin management and organization of water resources, improvement of water resources management activities, improvement of drinking water supply and sewerage, biological treatment mechanisms of wastewater, artificial intelligence using computer systems (training, expert, consulting, robot, etc.) to solve traditional intellectual problems creation of methods, tools and technologies for design, collection, processing and transmission of information, development of software for computer and telecommunication systems and networks, raising the intellectual potential of young people, their thinking and worldview, strengthening their ideological immunity, patriotism, love for the people, a mature generation that lives with a sense of loyalty, development of advanced technologies of education.

The faculty is conducting scientific activities in various directions and has International cooperation relations with educational institutions and scientific centers with high world ranking:

Colorado State University (USA) Peter the Great St Petersburg Polytechnic University (Russia) Kazakh-German University (Kazakhstan) University of Natural Resources and Natural Sciences in Vienna (Austria) Technical University of Munich (Germany) University of Lleida (Spain) Suez Canal University (Egypt) Belikesir University (Turkey) Sejong University (South Korea).

Currently, the leading scientists of the faculty are participating in the cooperation of the Japanese SATREPS scientific program, the Horizon-2020 program of the European Community, the German DAAD fund in Europe and Latin America on the subject of the SDGnexus Network and "The impact of climate change on water resources in Uzbekistan and its agriculture and they are conducting scientific research on the joint international scientific projects of Uzbekistan-Germany cooperation on the topic of 'Assessment of the consequences in the field of hydropower'".

Education and production integration activities have been launched on the basis of mutually beneficial cooperation with local and international scientific, higher education, production and management institutions in all directions of the departments of the faculty. Including

Ministry of Ecology, Environmental Protection and Climate Change of the Republic of Uzbekistan; Ministry of Construction and Housing and Communal Economy of the Republic of Uzbekistan; Ministry of Water Resource of the Republic of Uzbekistan; Information Resource Analysis Center of the Ministry of Water Management of the Republic of Uzbekistan; Tashkent City Department of Ecology, Environmental Protection and Climate Change; Scientific Research Institute of Environment and Nature Protection Technologies; LLC "Tashkent water supply" and others

The departments attached to the faculty consist of the following:

- The department "Ecology and water resources management"
- The department "Mechanization of hydromelioration works"
- The department "Life safety"
- The department "Physical Education and Sports"
- The department "Тeaching theory and methodology"
- The department "Uzbek language and literature"
- The department "Digital technologies and artificial intelligence"
- The department "Humanitarian sciences"
- Department of Legal Sciences
- For sustainable management of natural resources digital technology cluster (EcoGIS Center)
- UNESCO Chair in "Water Diplomacy, Water Resources Management, and Environmental Protection"

=== Faculty of Agriculture Mechanization ===
In 1920, among the eight faculties of the Turkestan State University, the Faculty of Engineering began to function. In 1930, the department of mechanical engineering of the university was transformed into the faculty of agricultural mechanization of the Central Asian Agricultural Institute. In 1931, the Central Asian Agricultural Mechanization Institute was established on the basis of the faculty. On November 11, 1934, this institute was transformed into the Tashkent Institute of Irrigation and Agricultural Mechanization Engineers (TIIAME). The Faculty of Agricultural Mechanization has been established as part of it. In the same year, 401 students studied at the faculty.

According to the government decision 415 of 3 September 2004, the faculty was transferred to the Tashkent State Agrarian University. According to the decision of the President of the Republic of Uzbekistan PD-3003 dated May 24, 2017, the faculty started operating again as part of the TIIAME from 2 September 2017.

In accordance with the decision of the President of the Republic of Uzbekistan on the establishment of the national research university "Tashkent Institute of Irrigation and Agricultural Mechanization Engineers" approved by PD-42 dated 10 December 2021, "Agricultural Mechanization " faculty is operating Nowadays, the departments of "Agricultural techniques and technologies", "Tractors and automobiles", "Engineering systems management" and "General technical sciences" are operating in the faculty.

The professors and teachers of the faculty are experts in international relations of higher educational institutions and scientific institutions of several foreign countries, such as the USA, Germany, England, Japan, Russia, China, Belarus, Kazakhstan, as well as the famous John Deere, Case, He established close cooperation with "Lemken" and "Rostselmash" companies, and special training rooms of these companies have been established in the faculty.

Development of modern resource-efficient mechanized technologies, technical tools in the cultivation and production of agricultural products with effective use of land, water, fuel-energy and material-technical resources in the mechanization of agricultural production, processes of mechanization of agricultural production based on local working conditions, rural technological processes of farm machinery, application of the optimal type of agrotechnical measures and organization of mechanized production in the use of agricultural machinery and management, the application of modern knowledge in the strategic development of machine-tractor fleets, the use of modern information technologies in management, the development of methods and mechanisms for monitoring and quality assessment of production processes at the faculty "mechanization of agriculture", "technical service in agriculture and water management", " application of innovative techniques and technologies in agriculture", "technology of storage and initial processing of agricultural products (by product types)", "metrology, standardization and product quality management (by sectors)"and "vocational education (agricultural mechanization)" bachelor courses and "agricultural mechanization" master's specialty are being trained.

Also, professors and teachers participate in activities related to the creation, improvement and testing of machines and equipment, standardization of equipment and materials in the implementation of scientific research works;use new technical tools in researching farming, animal husbandry and primary processing techniques; carrying out scientific research works on modern methods of using energy tools, agricultural machines in cooperation with research institutes and centers;analysis and application of digital technologies used in the country and in foreign countries on modern methods of driving tractor aggregates, assimilation programs of modern methods of aggregates management; conducting experimental studies on sample methods and participating in the analysis of their results, scientific research works are being carried out in the field of application of research results and developments to production.

of the faculty have been making a great contribution to the comprehensive mechanization of agriculture in our republic. Members of the government of the republic, a number of state and public figures, designers and scientists came out. In particular, the President of the Republic of Uzbekistan Mirziyoyev Shavkat Miromonovich studied at the faculty in 1976-1981.

The departments attached to the faculty consist of the following:

- The department "Engineering Systems Management"
- Department of "Agricultural techniques and technologies"
- The department "Tractors and cars"
- The department "General technical sciences"

=== Faculty of Hydromelioration ===
The Hydromelioration faculty was established in 1923 as part of the Technical faculty of the Turkestan State university in order to train personnel in the field of "Melioration engineering". In the early days of the establishment of the faculty, 49 professors taught 274 students in reclamation engineering. The history of the Faculty of Hydromelioration is closely related to the history of the university, and on 16 November 1934, it began to function as part of the "Tashkent institute of irrigation and agricultural mechanization engineers". The contributions of mature scientists and major specialists in the establishment and development of the faculty, as well as its formation as a prestigious scientific center on the scale of Central Asia, are incomparable. Today, the faculty includes "Hydraulics and hydroinformatics", "Hydrology and hydrogeology", "Irrigation and reclamation", "Using hydromelioration systems", "Mechanization of hydromelioration works", "Professional education", "Safety of life activities", "Physics and Chemistry" departments and "EcoGIS" center have been established. In the faculty, the experienced professors and teachers of the departments and centers organize scientific research and educational process at the level of modern requirements for bachelor and masters students.

In the faculty, the branches of the economy, in particular, the ministries of water management, agriculture and ecology, environment and climate change of the Republic of Uzbekistan, and among the leading organizations under its jurisdiction, prestigious foreign and domestic companies such as Netafim, Agrodrip, Ecodrip, Smart Solution "Water management and land reclamation", "Innovative technologies and their use in water management", "Hydrology", "Melioration hydrogeology", "Professional education", "Mechanization of water management and land reclamation" for the needs of enterprises, "Labor protection and technical safety", "Materials science and technology of new materials" have been training competitive personnel. From the 2023-2024 academic year, in accordance with the decision of the President of the Republic of Uzbekistan №. PD-42 December 10, personnel training in the field of education "Aerospace technologies and sustainable development" has been launched. Today, more than 1,200 students are studying in these fields of study in modern condition.

In order to identify talented students and involve them widely in educational and scientific activities, the faculty organizes various competitions and events in the field at various republican and international levels. In recent years, in cooperation with international organizations and projects, "World Water Day" has been organized at the national and international levels. As a result of the efforts of the faculty team to work with talented students and increase their efficiency, more than 10 presidential scholarships, more than 30 candidates for the state scholarship named after Beruniy, more than 20 winners of republican science olympiads, more than 100 different international and national start-ups and competition winners have been prepared.

In order to improve the quality of education and to enrich educational materials with the achievements of today's science, the faculty is carrying out large-scale research and development works. In particular, in recent years, in accordance with the scientific problems and orders of the Ministry of Higher Education, Science and Innovation and Water Management, as well as cooperation agreements, the effective use of water resources in the context of global climate change, the use of irrigated lands within the framework of the sustainable development goals of the United Nations improvement of land reclamation, research of irrigation standards and regimes of agricultural crops based on geoinformation systems, creation of software for designing water-saving technologies, improvement of hydrological regimes of reservoirs, hydraulics and hydrology of open riverbeds and water 20.0 billion for increasing the hydraulic efficiency and operational reliability of irrigation networks. More than 100,000 soums of fundamental, practical and construction works are being carried out and are gradually being involved in the educational process.

The faculty is engaged in a wide range of activities related to the study of foreign experience and the development of international cooperation. In recent years, as a result of the effective activity of the faculty scientists, 16 international research projects with a total value of 354030 $ + 837990 € in the fields of comprehensive scientific, methodical and academic mobility with prestigious scientific research institutes and universities of the USA, European countries, CIS and Eastern countries grands have been achieved. In order to expand the scope of international cooperation, regular international scientific conferences, seminars-trainings and various competitions are held at the faculty. Also, professors and teachers of the faculty departments of the prestigious scientific research institutes and universities of countries such as China, Turkey, and Slovakia are involved in the educational process.

In recent years, in cooperation with UN development programs, Lindsay and USAID of the United States, Israel's Netafim, Korea's K-Water, China's SuperMap and Xinjiang-Tianye and other large foreign companies and projects to improve the educational process, strengthen the material and technical base, and student practice significant results are being achieved in increasing efficiency.

The departments attached to the faculty consist of the following:

- The department "Ecology and water resources management"
- The department "Physics and chemistry"
- The department "Hydraulics and hydroinformatics"
- The department "Hydrology and hydrogeology"
- The department "Mechanization of hydromelioration works"
- The department "Use of Hydromelioration Systems"
- The department "Life safety"
- The department "Irrigation and Melioration"
- The department "Physical Education and Sports"

=== Faculty of Land Resources and Cadastre ===
The faculty was established in 1945 as part of the Tashkent Institute of Irrigation and Agricultural Mechanization Engineers under the name "Land Surveying", and since 2004 it has been operating under the name "Land Use and Land Cadastre", and since 2018 "Land Resources Management". Since 2022, the "Tashkent Institute of Irrigation and Agricultural Mechanization Engineers" has been operating as the "Land Resources and Cadastre" faculty of the National Research University.

The faculty is a leading institution in the republic that trains highly educated personnel in the fields of land management, land cadastre, geodesy, geoinformatics, cartography and cadastre. When the faculty was first established, its first head was Associate Professor M.N. Maslov, and later Professor P.K. Tatur, Associate Professors J.K. Baranov, V.S. Artamonov, A.N. Nazirov, A.T. Abdurazzokov, Professor O. Ramazonov, Associate Professor Q. Rakhmonov, Professor S. Avezbayev, Associate Professor Z.M. Muqimov and Associate Professor Sh. Narbayev were the leaders. Currently, PhD, Associate Professor A.N. Inamov heads the faculty.

The departments attached to the faculty consist of the following:

- The department "State cadastres"
- The department "Geodesy and geoinformatics"
- The department "Higher mathematics"
- The department "Soil Science and Agriculture"
- The department "Land Resources Management"

== Students' town ==
Students' town was first established in 1987 under the Tashkent Irrigation and Mechanization of Agricultural industry Engineers Institute. Since 2004 it is considered to be the students' town of the Tashkent Irrigation and Melioration Institute. Students' town consists of three students' dormitories numbered 2, 3, and 4, and with buildings numbered 6 and 7 for the university staff. The director of the students' town is Bozorov Baxtiyor Xakimovich.

=== Dormitories ===
Every dormitory in students' town holds students from various faculties. Dormitory #2 holds 232 students from Automating and Mechanizing the Water Industry faculty and 44 students from Building of Irrigation Hydro Technical Construction and Usage faculty. Overall, dormitory 2 holds 276 students.

Dormitory #3 holds about 410 students from different faculties.

Dormitory #4 holds 385 students from different faculties.

Buildings 6 and 7 mainly serve university staff representatives and young scientists. There are 162 rooms in those buildings and 607 people living there.

Every building is provided with solutions for the essential needs of every individual. There are sport halls, kitchens, reading halls, and restrooms in each level of the buildings. They all are fully provided with gas and electric energy. The student town has a library which provides the students with most of the necessary textbooks. The kitchen rooms of the dormitories are provided with tables, chairs, and ovens.

== Academic lyceums ==
There are two academic lyceums which were opened under the name of Tashkent Institute of Irrigation and Melioration. They are Yunusabad Academic Lyceum and International House – Tashkent Lyceum. They were opened to cover high demands for qualified high-school graduates. The representative from the university who works with the lyceums is Makumova Dilrabo Innatovna

=== Yunusabad Academic Lyceum ===
Yunusabad Academic Lyceum was first established under the Tashkent Irrigation and Mechanization of Agricultural Industry Engineers Institute in 1987, with another name of "Universal Technical Lyceum". However, after the independence of Uzbekistan by the edict of the Cabinet of Ministers of Uzbekistan on 23 September 1998, the name of the lyceum must have been changed. This edict was done only after the year, on 2 September 1999, and was renamed and re-established by the edict number 406 to Yunusabad Academic Lyceum. There are three faculties in this academic lyceum: Exact Sciences, Natural Sciences, and Social-Humanitarian Subjects.

Exact Sciences faculty:

- Physics, math (technical branch)
- Math, English language (economical branch)

Natural Sciences faculty:

- Chemistry, biology (medical branch)

Social-Humanitarian Subjects faculty:

- History, English language, law (history branch)

Only prospective students who have successfully completed the nine year secondary program can apply to the university. Then they can be examined by the lyceum administration. Students from other regions are provided with dormitories.

There are five departments in Yunusabad Academic Lyceum:

- Mathematics department;
- Natural Sciences department
- Uzbek Language and Literature department
- Foreign Languages department
- Social-Humanitarian Subjects department

=== International House – Tashkent lyceum ===
International House in Tashkent is one of the two lyceums which were established under the name of Tashkent Institute of Irrigation and Agricultural Mechanization Engineers. However, the lyceum first was opened as the education center in 1993, in order to inherit educational processes and techniques from the developed countries of the United Kingdom and the US. The lyceum was located in the center of the Tashkent city, and it is easy to find its location, by the metro station Hamid Olimjon. In 2007 by the edict of Islam Karimov, the simple education center was fully set to be the academic lyceum, and was given under the Tashkent Institute of Irrigation and Melioration. In 2009, for making the academic lyceum fully standard with the world's requirements, reconstruction works were established. The education in the lyceum is based on the Uzbekistan's educational standards, and held in two different faculties, Exact Sciences and Social-Humanitarian Sciences.

In 2011 International House academic lyceum published their own magazine catalog, which details the lyceum. The magazine was named We are Inter House! The materials for the magazine were collected from the year of 2009. Nowadays about 300 students are studying at the International House lyceum and there are two professors, four docents and a number of highly qualified teachers.

=== Rankings ===
TIIAME- National Research University ranked no. 1 university in Uzbekistan in national, QS and Times Higher Education World University Ranking. It ranked# 458 in QS World University Rankings 2027: Top global universities and ranked# 501 in Times World University Rankings 2026 .

=== International Partnerships ===
TIIAME maintains strong ties with 50+ institutions worldwide on mutual academic cooperation and Research, including:

• Wageningen University (Netherlands)

• Humboldt University (Germany)

• Colorado State University (USA)

• Xinjiang Institute of Ecology and Geography (China)

• Indian Institute of Technology Roorkee, IIT Roorkee (India)

== See also ==
- Turin Polytechnic University in Tashkent
- Inha University in Tashkent
- Tashkent State Technical University
- Tashkent Financial Institute
- Tashkent Automobile and Road Construction Institute
- Management Development Institute of Singapore in Tashkent
- Tashkent State University of Economics
- Tashkent State Agrarian University
- Tashkent State University of Law
- Tashkent University of Information Technologies
- University of World Economy and Diplomacy
- Westminster International University in Tashkent
