= TEAM University Tashkent =

University in Tashkent, Uzbekistan

TEAM University
- TEAM Universiteti
- TEAM University, evening view
- Motto: Strive to change
- Type: Private
- Established: 18 April 2020
- Rector: Alan France
- Location: 146 Temur Malik Street, Yashnobod District, Tashkent, Uzbekistan; 41°18′33″N 69°20′39″E
- Campus: Urban
- Website: teamuni.uz
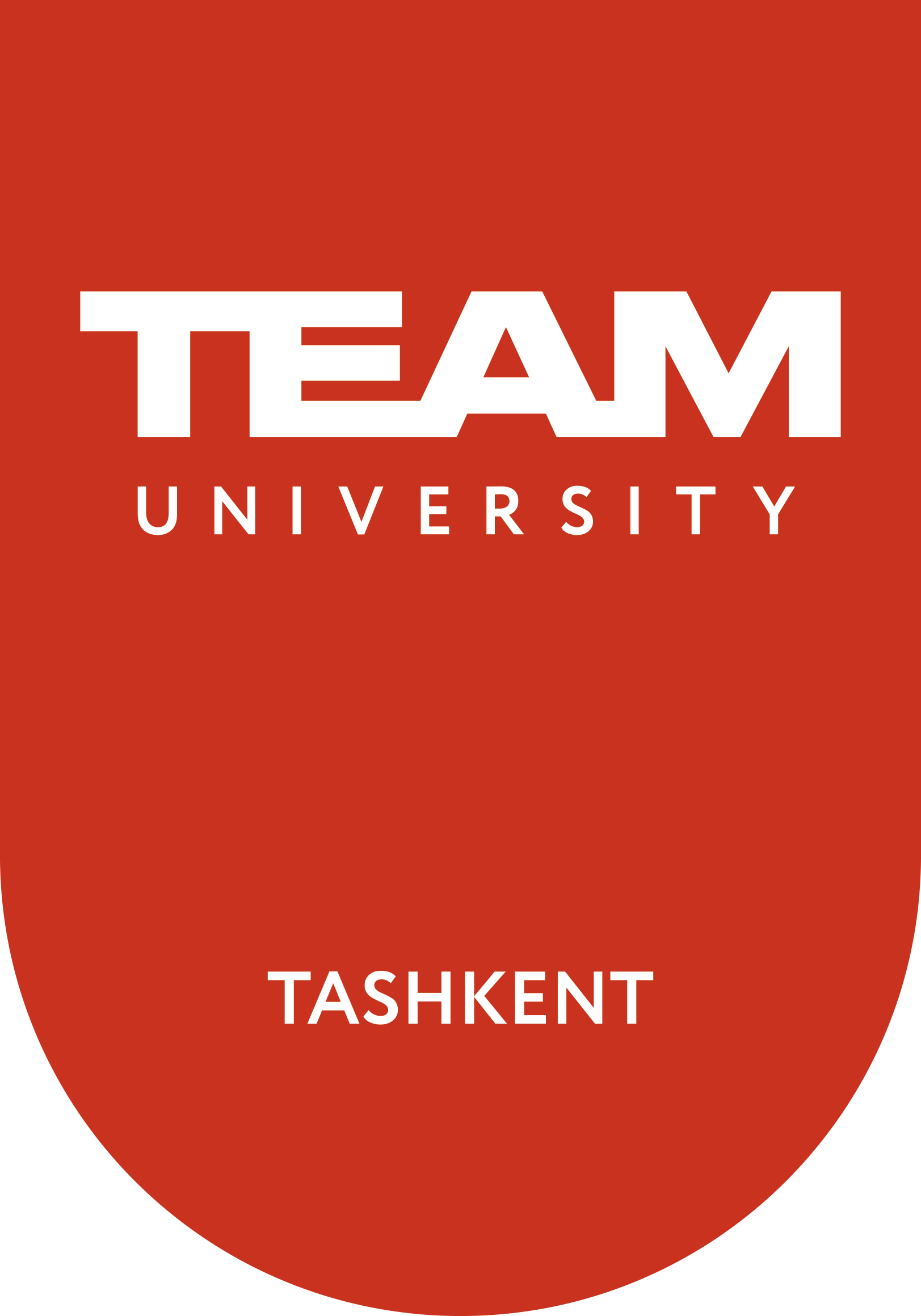

TEAM University is an entrepreneurial university in Tashkent, Uzbekistan. Founded in April 2020 by the decree of the Cabinet of Ministers number 241 from 18 April 2020 and granted a license by the State Inspection for Supervision of Quality in Education with number 0007. The university is the first entrepreneurial university in Uzbekistan and it is founded as a private, non-state owned institution.

In 2020 TEAM launched the inaugural admission to its International Foundation Course (level 3 UK NQF), which was validated according to the recommendations of the Quality Assurance Agency (QAA) on 29 July 2020. Additionally, TEAM is one of the few Universities in Uzbekistan that offers a winter start for its International Foundation Course.

From 2021 TEAM is planning admission to its degree level programmes (levels 4, 5, 6 UK NQF).

== Partner institution ==
TEAM is partnering with London South Bank University (LSBU) in the UK to validate its programmes. LSBU was chosen as a partner of TEAM after a through consideration of other potential candidates from the UK, and has been selected for its support and outstanding record of entrepreneurial education for which it has been award a title of "Entrepreneurial University of the year" in 2016 by The Times and Sunday Times Good University Guide.

== Governance ==
The founders of TEAM University established an independent Board of Trustees. Since the beginning of the university, the Board has been constituted and is chaired by an independent member. The Board drafted a constitution with a majority of representatives who are independent(non-sharing). This ensures that the position and interests of the founders and shareholders are limited. The constitution requires the Board to safeguard against financial self-interest and allows the university to be regulated by strong standards of management and business principles. The Board is chaired by Andrew Wachtel.

== Course offerings ==
=== International Foundation Course ===
The International Foundation Course (IFC) is a one-year full-time programme of study that TEAM offers to students who wish to pursue their desire to study on a UK degree programme in Uzbekistan. The course has been designed to equip students with the necessary skills and competencies for successful academic study on an undergraduate programme. All students who successfully complete this course will be awarded a TEAM Foundation certificate.

== Facilities ==
The first and second floor is a mixed area with formal teaching rooms, social areas and offices. The Mansard is given to the executive offices of the university and contains a variety of office spaces, meeting rooms and technical specific-purpose facilities.

== Location ==
TEAM university is located in a developing area of Tashkent in Yashnobod District. Major urban development projects are taking place around the university including construction of the Tashkent Metro (TEAM is served by the Yashnobod station), Parkent and Makhtumkili street urban development projects, Karasu housing development project. The area around the university is diverse and reflects the cultural mixes natural to Tashkent and Uzbekistan. There is a mosque, Armenian Orthodox Church of St. Pillip, Do'stobod mahalla, Korasuv channel embankment (Temur Malik street), Tuzel airport in the close proximity to TEAM.

== Gallery ==
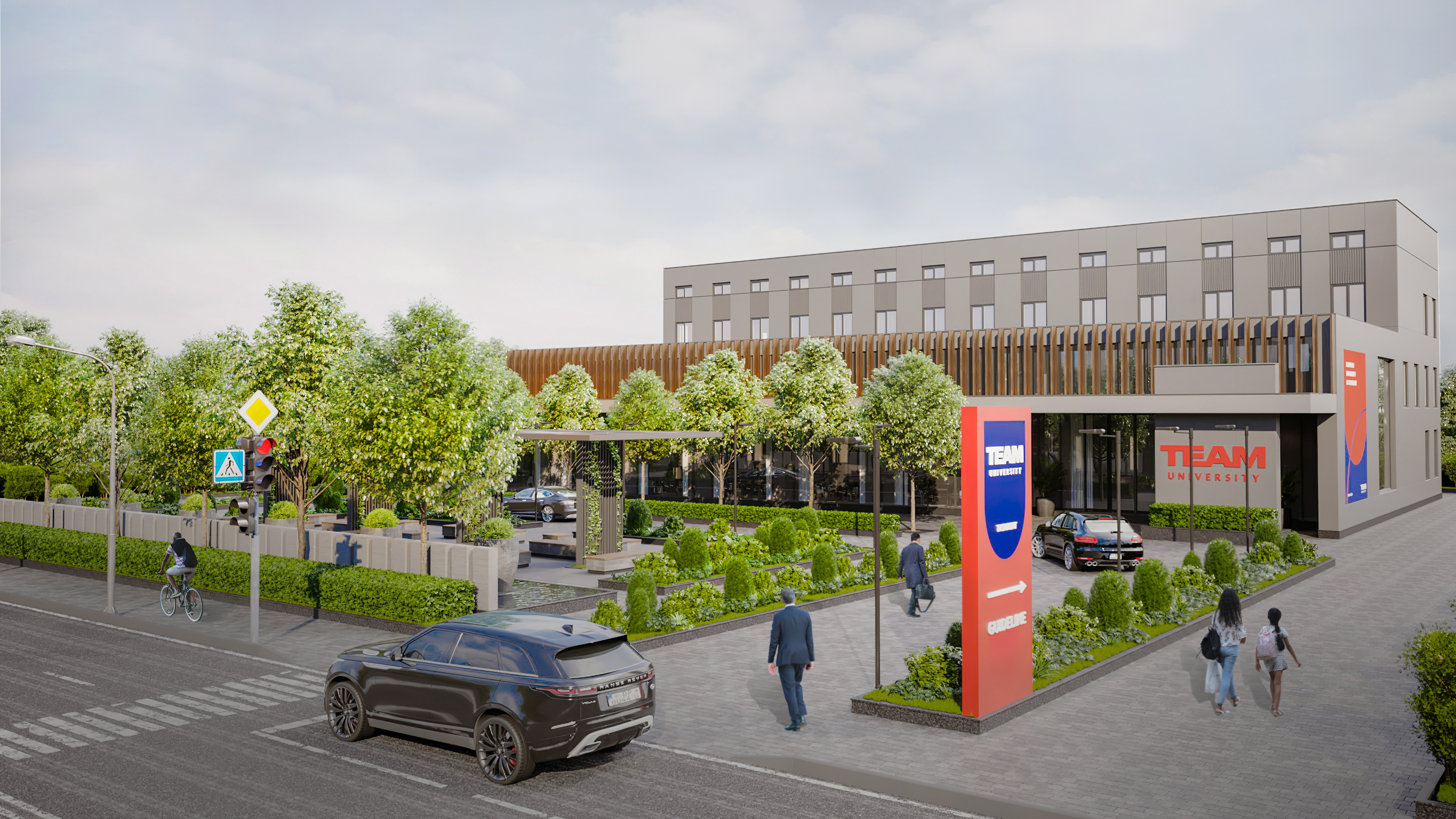
Façade view

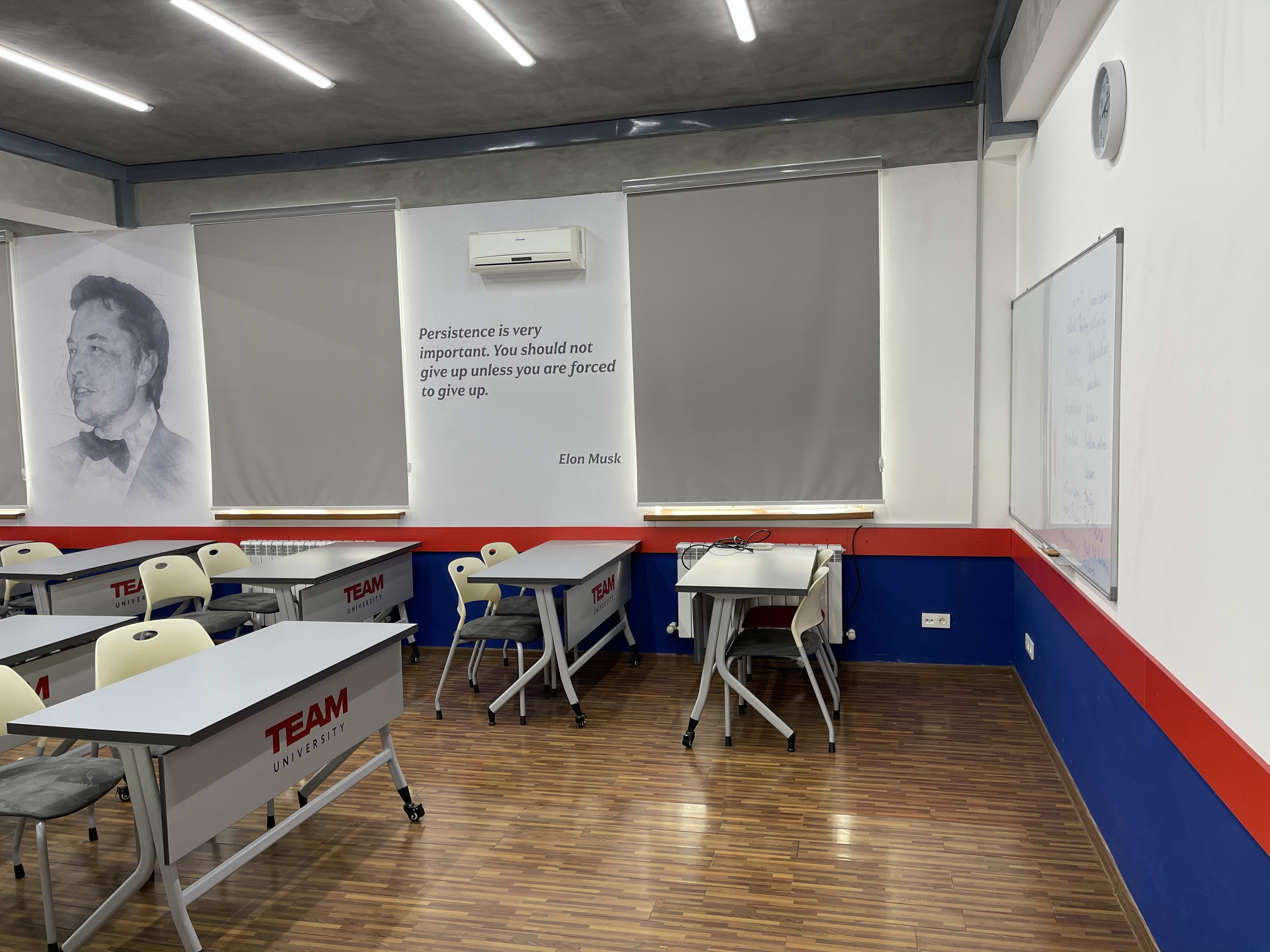
Elon Musk room

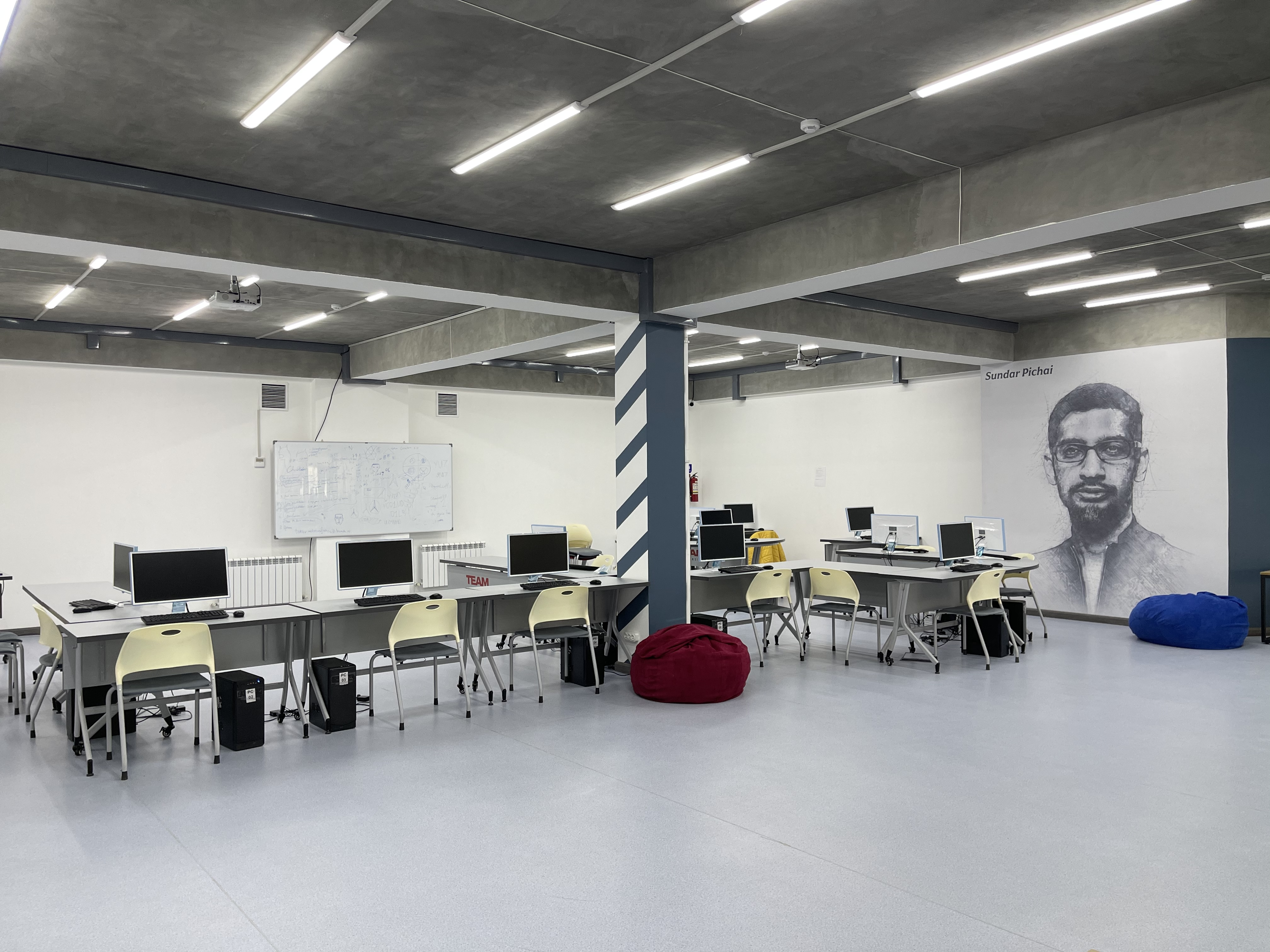
Sundar Pichai room

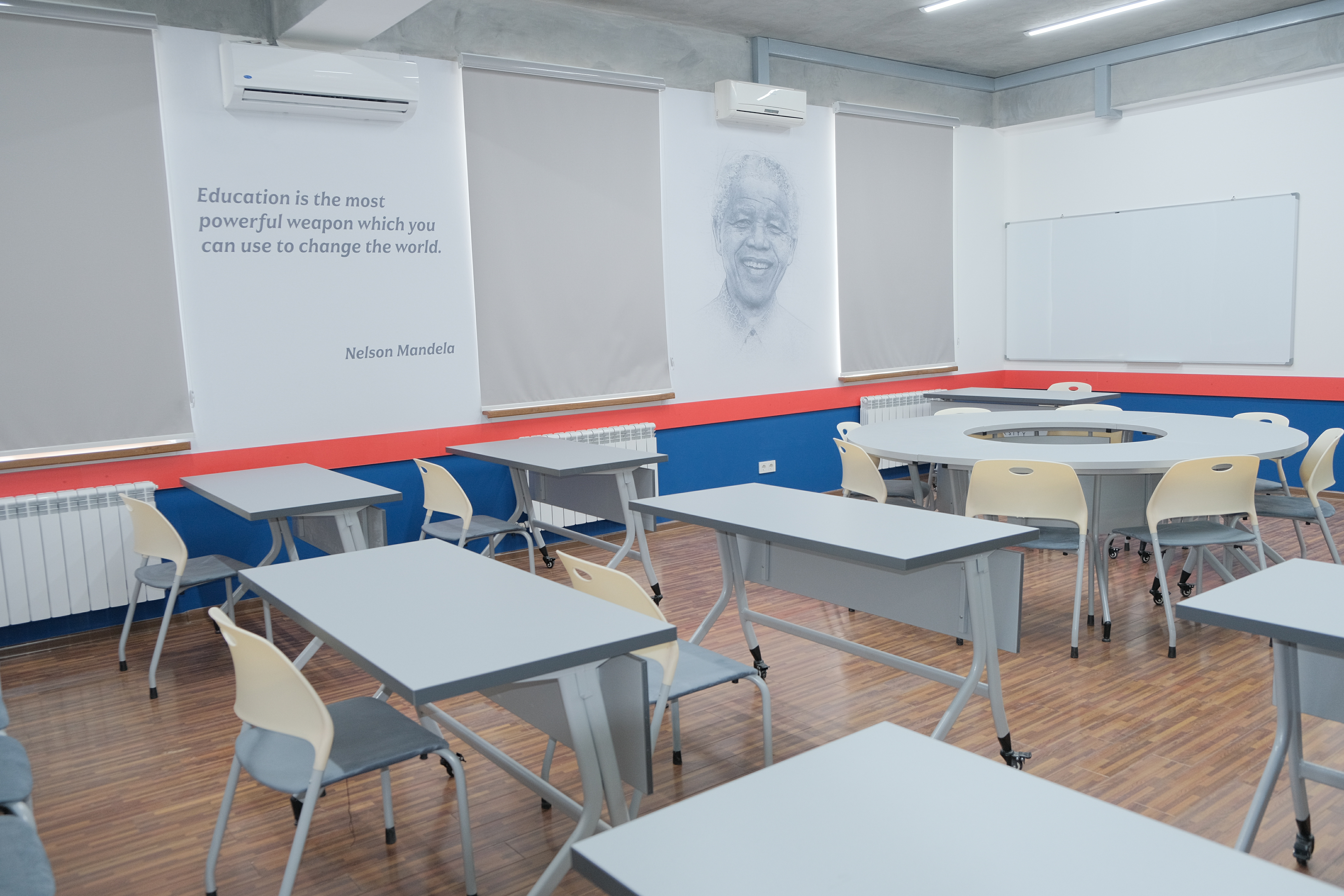
Nelson Mandela room

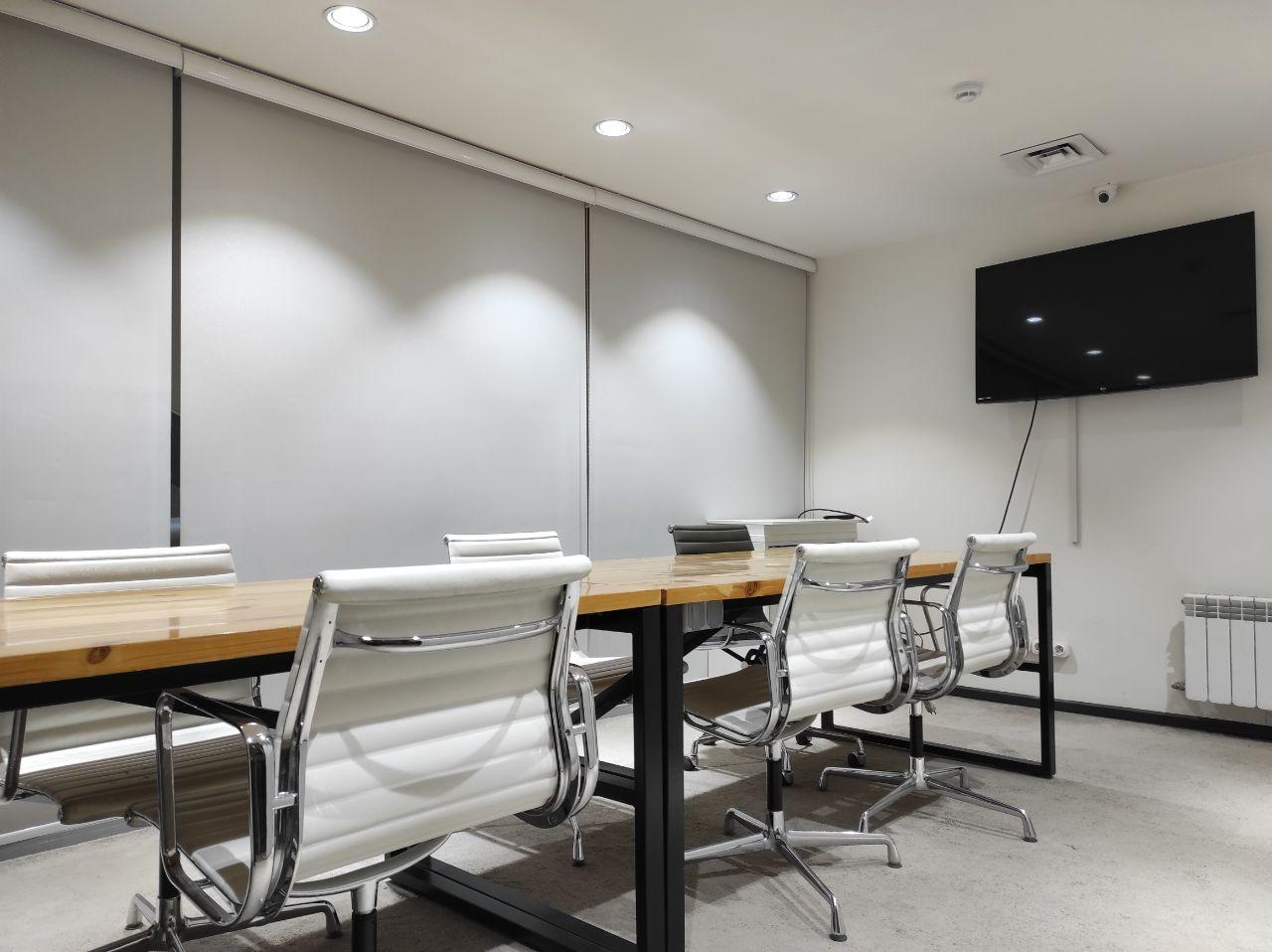
Meeting room

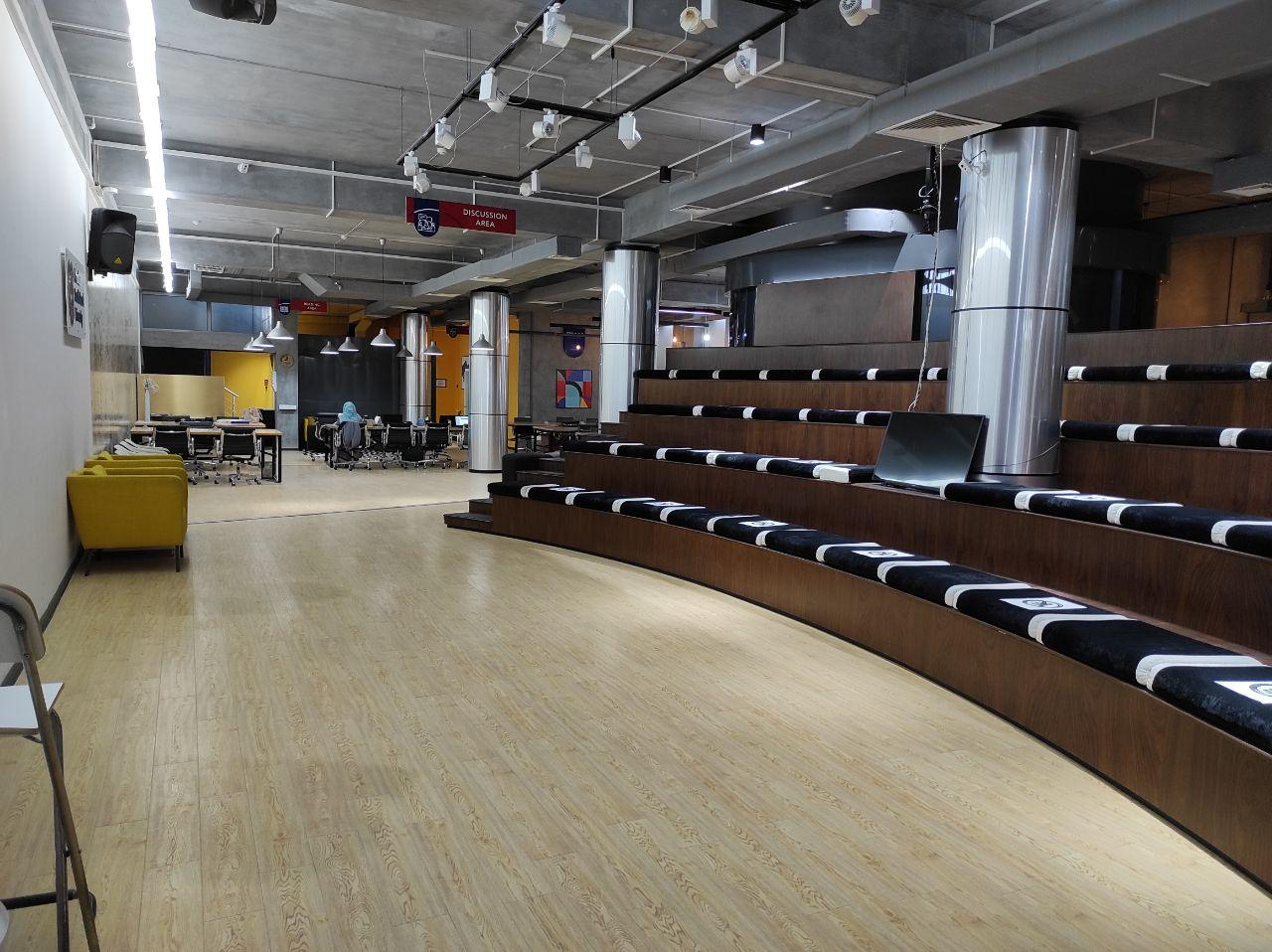
Discussion Area at the Learning Resource Center

== See also ==
- Education in England
- Education in Uzbekistan
- Tashkent
- Tashkent State University of Economics
- Universities in the United Kingdom
