= List of universities in Uzbekistan =

There are numerous universities in Uzbekistan.

== Andijan ==
- Andijan Agriculture Institute
- Andijan Machine-Building Institute
- Andijan State Medical Institute
- Andijan State University
- Sharda University - Uzbekistan

== Namangan ==
- Namangan State University

== Bukhara ==
- Bukhara Engineering Institute of High Technology
- Bukhara State Medical Institute
- Bukhara State University
- Asia International University
- Zarmed University

== Gulistan ==
- Gulistan State University

== Jizzakh ==
- Jizzakh Polytechnic University
- Jizzakh State Pedagogical University

== Margilan ==
- Margilan University

== Navoi ==
- Navoi State Mining Institute
- Navoi State Pedagogical Institute

== Nukus ==
- Karakalpak State University

== Qashqadaryo ==
- Qarshi University

== Samarkand ==
- Institute of Archaeology of the Science Academy of Uzbekistan (in Samarkand)
- Samarkand Veterinary Medicine Institute
- Samarkand State Institute of Architecture and Construction
- Samarkand Institute of Economics and Service
- Samarkand State Institute of Foreign Languages
- Samarkand State Medical Institute
- Samarkand State University
- "Silk Road" International University of Tourism and Cultural Heritage
- Samarkand International University of Technology
- Zarmed University

== Tashkent ==
- New Uzbekistan University
- University of Digital Economics and Agrotechnologies
- Tashkent Metropolitan University
- Ajou University in Tashkent
- Pharmaceutical Technical University
- TEAM University
- Tashkent State Pedagogical University
- Bucheon University in Tashkent
- Tashkent State Institute of Oriental Studies
- Sharda University, Andijan, Uzbekistan
- Inha University in Tashkent
- International Agriculture University
- Management Development Institute of Singapore in Tashkent
- Moscow State University in Tashkent named for M. V. Lomonosov
- National University of Uzbekistan
- Tashkent Automobile and Road Construction Institute
- Tashkent Institute of Architecture and Civil Engineering
- Tashkent Institute of Finance
- Tashkent Institute of Education
- Tashkent Institute of Irrigation and Melioration
- Tashkent State Agrarian University
- Tashkent State Technical University
- Tashkent State University of Economics
- Tashkent Medical Academy
- Tashkent Pediatric Medical Institute
- Tashkent State Dental Institute
- Tashkent Institute of Postgraduate Medical Education
- Tashkent Pharmaceutical Institute
- Central Asian University in Tashkent - CAU
- Tashkent State University of Law
- Amity University in Tashkent
- Tashkent University of Information Technologies
- University of World Economy and Diplomacy
- Uzbekistan State University of World Languages
- Westminster International University in Tashkent
- Turin Polytechnic University in Tashkent
- Webster University in Tashkent
- Kimyo International University in Tashkent
- Tashkent Pediatric Medical Institute Nukus branch
- Nordic International university
- Japan Digital University

== Xorazm ==
- Urgench State University (41.556301°N 60.606669°E OSM ID)
- Urgench branch of the Tashkent University of Information Technologies (TATU) (41.570357°N 60.631871°E OSM ID) + (41.5443687°N 60.6222763°E OSM ID)
- Urgench branch of Tashkent Medical Academy (41.548245°N 60.633540°E OSM ID)
- Al-Khwarizmi University (41.5603812°N 60.6270567°E OSM ID)
