= Tashkent Institute of Architecture and Civil Engineering =

Tashkent University of Architecture and Civil Engineering
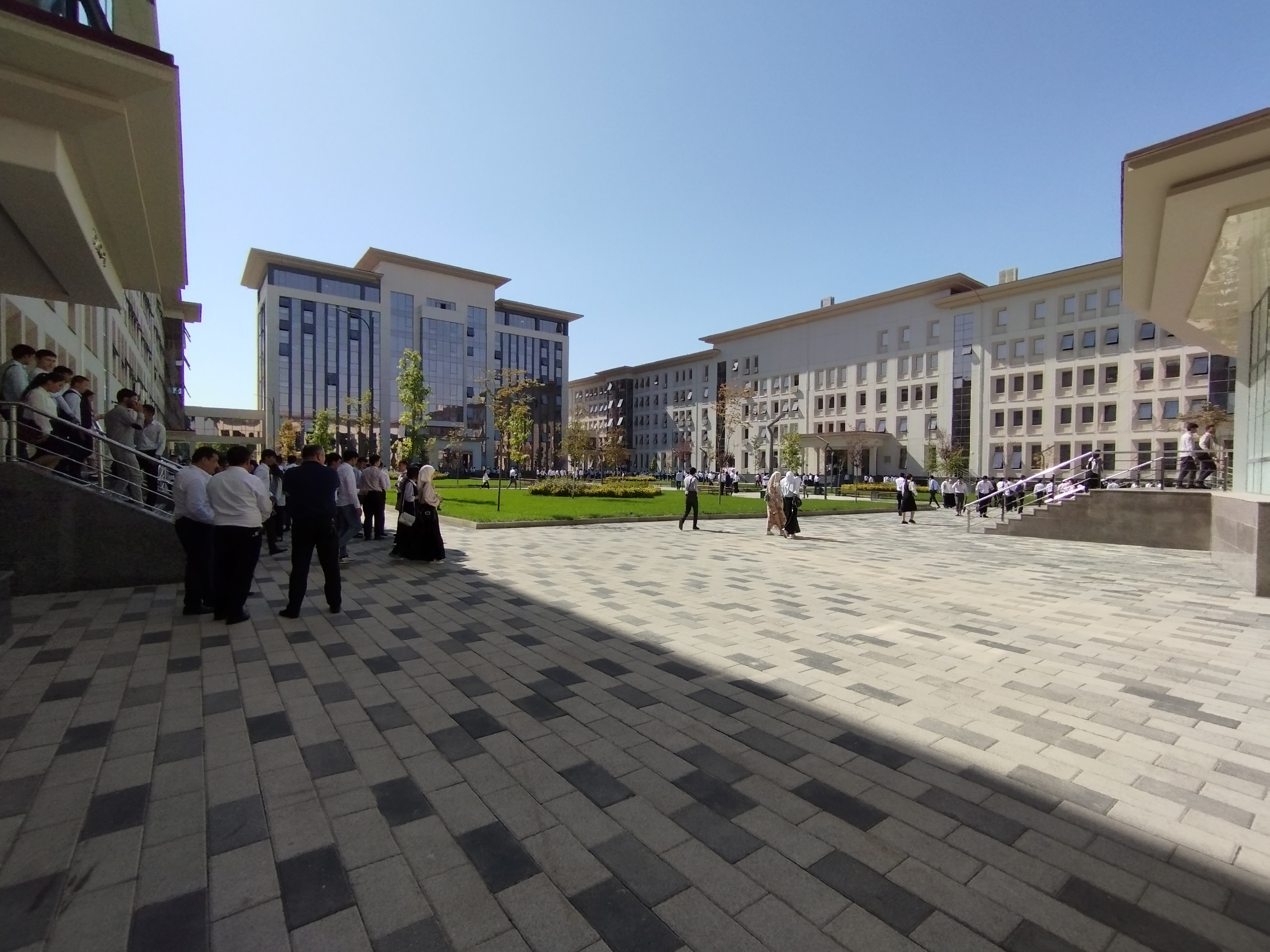
- Type: Public
- Established: May 6, 1991
- Rector: Dr. Bakhrom Tulaganov
- Location: 9A Yangishahar Street, Tashkent, Uzbekistan; 41°21′35″N 69°18′17″E
- Campus: multiple sites
- Website: taqu.uz
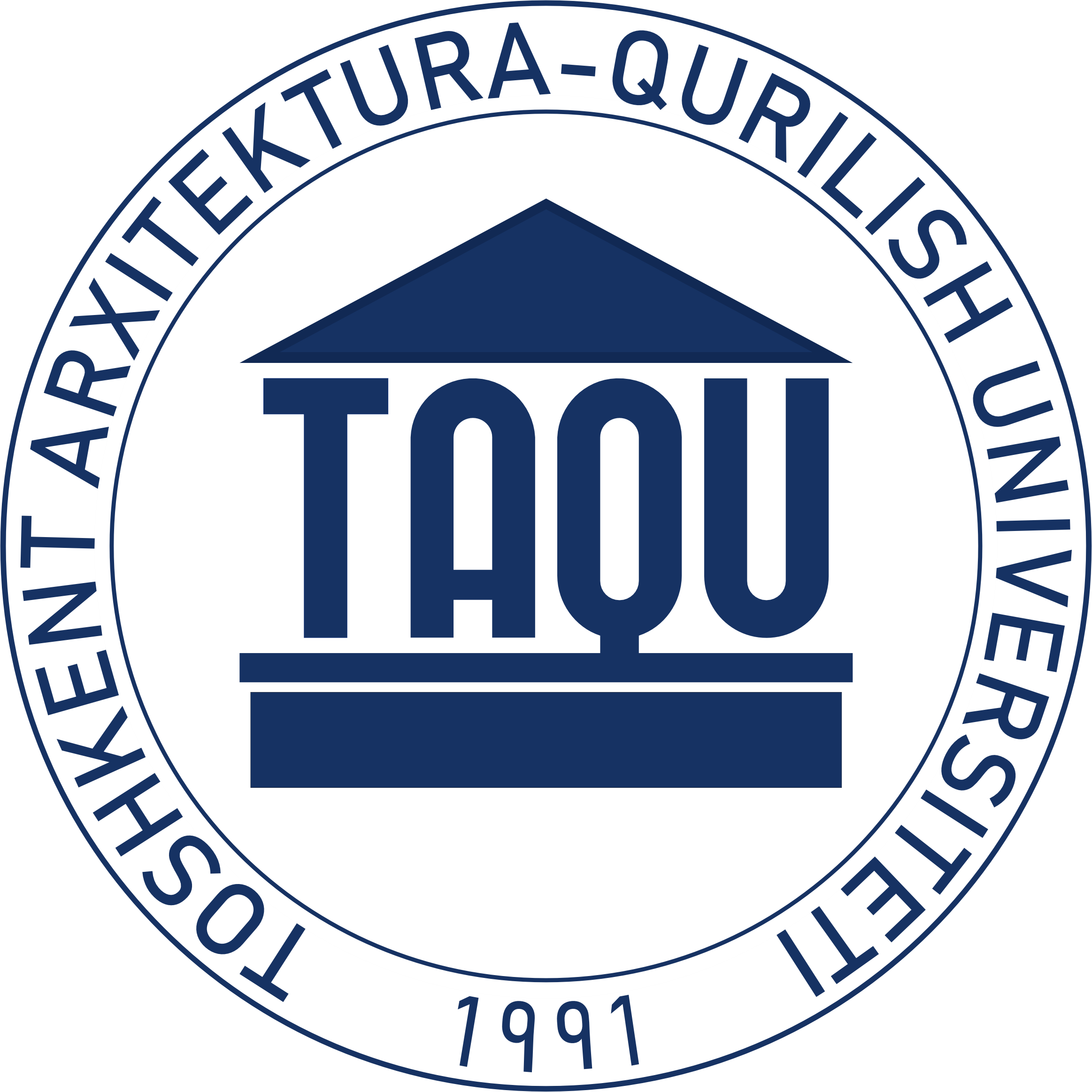

Tashkent University of Architecture and Civil Engineering, previously known as Tashkent Architectural Construction Institute was organized by the Decree of the President of the Republic of Uzbekistan (No. 400, May 6, 1991) as part of Tashkent State Technical University. The institute offers architectural and construction. The institute has the faculty of Architecture, Department of Building and Construction, Civil Engineering and Construction Management, as well as the department of International Relations. There are plans for a faculty of Modern Urban Studies and Agglomeration Management.

Full-time and part-time faculty train more than 3,000 students from 16 educational areas, which include 20 specialties. During training, students have the opportunity to develop theoretical knowledge and research skills. Scientific and educational work is done by more than 200 highly qualified professors. Specialised unions offer doctoral and master's theses in architecture and construction.

The institute's research is included in the State Science and Technology Plan of the Republic of Uzbekistan. The institute's specialists design public and residential buildings, industrial and agricultural waste disposal facilities, develop and organize the production of efficient building materials and construction, and ensure earthquake resistance.

== See also ==
- Inha University in Tashkent
- Tashkent State Technical University
- Tashkent Institute of Irrigation and Agricultural Mechanization Engineers
- Tashkent Institute of Finance
- Tashkent Automobile and Road Construction Institute
- Management Development Institute of Singapore in Tashkent
- Tashkent State University of Economics
- Tashkent State Agrarian University
- Tashkent State University of Law
- Tashkent University of Information Technologies
- University of World Economy and Diplomacy
- Westminster International University in Tashkent
