= Vladimir Yakhontov =

Soviet and Uzbek entomologist (1899–1970)

- Владимир Владимирович Яхонтов
- Born: November 23, 1899; Sorovskoye, Perm Governorate, Russian Empire
- Died: January 17, 1970 (aged 70); Tashkent, Uzbek SSR, Soviet Union
- Resting place: Botkin Cemetery, Tashkent, Uzbekistan
- Citizenship: USSR
- Education: Leningrad Institute of Applied Zoology and Phytopathology (IZIF)
- Occupation: Entomologist
- Known for: Research on agricultural pests of Central Asia, biological control, taxonomy of thrips, insect ecology
- Awards: Honored Scientist of the Uzbek SSR (1960), Order of Lenin
- Scientific career
- Fields: Agricultural entomology, biological control, insect ecology, Thysanoptera, Coccinellidae
- Workplaces: Tashkent Institute of Agriculture, Institute of Zoology and Parasitology of the Academy of Sciences of the Uzbek SSR
- Author abbrev. (zoology): Yakhontov

Vladimir Vladimirovich Yakhontov (Russian: Владимир Владимирович Яхонтов; 23 November 1899 – 17 January 1970) was a Soviet and Uzbek entomologist. He is recognized as one of the leading Central Asian entomologists of the mid-20th century. Yakhontov authored the USSR's first official university-level textbook on insect ecology, established the scientific school of agricultural entomology in Uzbekistan, and was a leading Soviet authority on the insect order Thysanoptera (thrips).

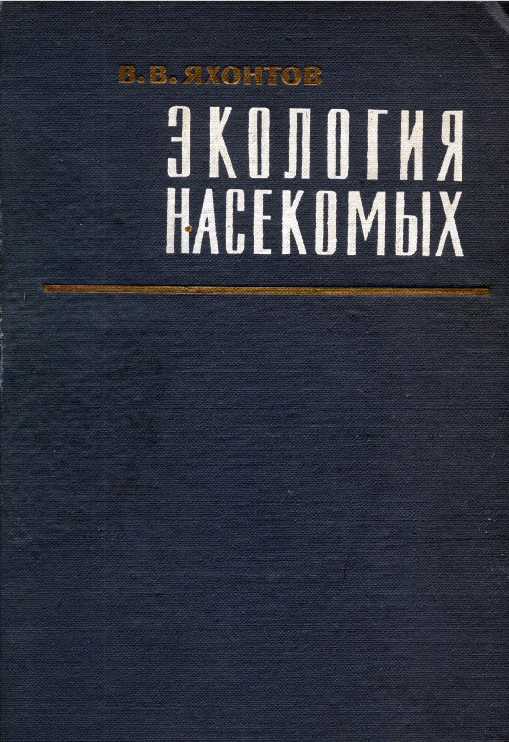
The first Soviet university textbook on insect ecology - Insect Ecology by Vladimir Yakhontov

Yakhontov founded the Department of Entomology and Zoology at the Tashkent Institute of Agriculture, heading it for over 35 years, and later served as Director of the Institute of Zoology and Parasitology of the Academy of Sciences of the Uzbek SSR. Yakhontov was also the founder and long-time president of the Uzbekistan Entomological Society (1952–1970). His academic credentials and honors included a PhD (1934), a Doctor of Biological Sciences degree (1943), a Professor (1935), a Corresponding Member of the Academy of Sciences of the Uzbek SSR (1956), and the title of Honored Scientist of the Uzbek SSR (1960).

== Biography and career ==
Yakhontov was born on 23 November 1899 in the village of Sorovskoye, Perm Governorate of the Russian Empire (now part of the Kurgan Oblast, Russia) to a family in which both parents initially worked as rural schoolteachers before later becoming agronomists. He developed a strong interest in nature during childhood and published his first scientific article on apiculture in the Altai Mountains in the journal Pchelovodnoye Delo ("Beekeeping") in 1921.

After graduating from a secondary school (realnoye uchilishche) in Shadrinsk, he enrolled at the Institute of Applied Zoology and Phytopathology in Leningrad, graduating in 1927. Alongside his academic studies, Yakhontov devoted considerable time to learning foreign languages, completing German language courses and the Berlitz direct method English courses in Leningrad.

Yakhontov first visited Central Asia in 1926 for undergraduate practical field research. Following his graduation in 1927, he was appointed head of the entomology department at the Shirabudin Agricultural Experiment Station in Bukhara, where he focused on the insect pests impacting cotton and alfalfa crops. In 1929, he transferred to the plant protection station of the Main Cotton Committee in Tashkent, expanding his research into laboratory methodologies, applied entomology, and the ecology of pests such as cotton leafhoppers, aphids, cotton moths, and thrips. He combined research with teaching activities, lecturing at the Central Asian University (now National University of Uzbekistan), and later at the Tashkent Institute of Agriculture.

In 1933, Yakhontov joined the Tashkent Institute of Agriculture, where he established the Department of Entomology and Zoology, and served as its chair for nearly 40 years (1933–1970). In 1934, he was awarded the degree of Candidate of Biological Sciences without a dissertation defense. He was appointed to the rank of Professor by the Higher Attestation Commission in 1935. Although his 415-page doctoral manuscript was completed in Tashkent in 1941, wartime disruptions delayed his defense until 1943, when he successfully defended his Doctor of Biological Sciences dissertation before the Academic Council of the Agricultural University of Georgia in Tbilisi. The dissertation was titled The Alfalfa Weevil (Phytonomus variabilis Hbst): Its Native Range and Current Distribution, Economic Importance, Systematic Position, Morphology and Anatomy, Biology and Ecology, and Control Measures.

In 1954, Yakhontov joined the Institute of Zoology and Parasitology of the Academy of Sciences of the Uzbek SSR, where he directed the Entomology Laboratory until 1957. In 1956, he was elected a Corresponding Member of the Academy of Sciences of the Uzbek SSR and appointed Deputy Director of Scientific Work at the Institute, as well as Deputy Chairman of the Department of Biological Sciences. From 1960 to 1963, he served as the Director of the Institute of Zoology and Parasitology, where he established the Laboratory of Biological Pest Control.

In 1965, Yakhontov returned to the Department of Entomology and Zoology at the Tashkent Institute of Agriculture, where he worked for the remainder of his life.

Yakhontov established a scientific school of agricultural entomology in Uzbekistan. Throughout his career, Yakhontov mentored and supervised over 40 doctoral and candidate researchers to their thesis defenses. Among his notable students were Professor Rakhim Alimjanov (a Corresponding Member of the Uzbek Academy of Sciences), T. S. Zakirov (D.Sc.), M. G. Ismailov (D.Sc.), K.I. Mirpulatov (PhD), G.G. Kurbanov (PhD), A.H. Saidov (PhD), and Amina Davletshina (PhD). He also acted as an official thesis opponent for over 100 doctoral and candidate defenses across the USSR.

In 1952, Yakhontov founded and served as the first president of the Uzbekistan Entomological Society - a branch of the All-Union Entomological Society (1952-1970). He was also an Honorary Member of the All-Union Entomological Society and served on the editorial boards of prominent Soviet scientific journals, including Zashchita Rastenii ("Plant Protection", Moscow) and the Uzbek Biological Journal (Tashkent).

Yakhontov died on 17 January 1970 and was buried at the Botkin Cemetery (Plot 16) in Tashkent.

== Scientific contributions ==
Yakhontov was an expert on agricultural pests affecting cotton and alfalfa in Central Asia. His 664-page monograph, Pests of Agricultural Plants and Products of Central Asia and Their Control (1953), became the standard regional reference on agricultural entomology and has been recognized as one of the major contributions to the development of entomology in Uzbekistan. The volume was written to address the lack of a comprehensive reference adapted to Central Asia's ecological and agricultural conditions, as contemporary Soviet textbooks focused primarily on the European part of the USSR and provided limited coverage of the region's crops and pest fauna. Commissioned following a resolution adopted at the 1949 All-Union Plenum of the Plant Protection Section of VASKhNIL, the monograph replaced the outdated regional synthesis published by Vasily Plotnikov in 1926 by incorporating newly introduced crops such as sugar beet and citrus, as well as advances in pest control methods and insecticides. It synthesized more than 25 years of regional research, drawing on published literature, institutional data, and Yakhontov's own field observations and experiments.

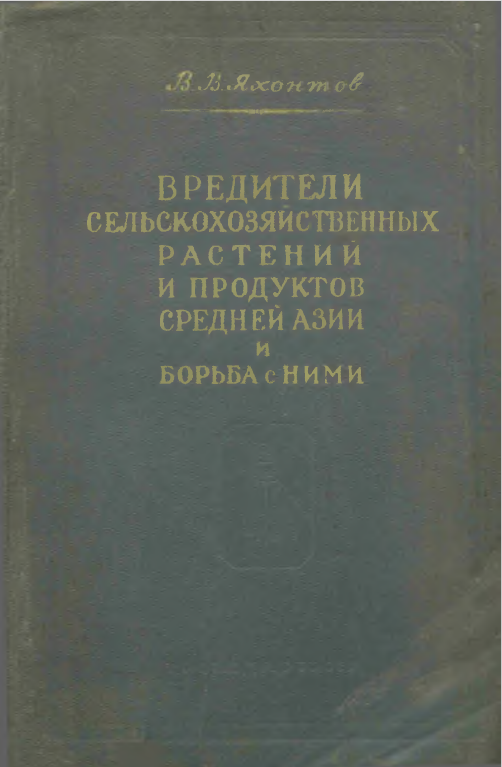
Front cover of Vladimir Yakhontov's monograph Pests of Agricultural Plants and Products of Central Asia and Their Control - a 664-page regional synthesis and a foundational framework for agricultural pest management in Central Asia (1953)

He was a pioneer in biological pest control and insect forecasting methods used in Central Asia. He justified the integration of local ladybird beetles (Coccinellidae) to manage cotton aphid populations and pioneered a new approach in biological control: improving the efficacy of entomophages (insect-eating organisms) by hybridizing geographically isolated races and forms. Several of Yakhontov's studies focused on the biology, ecology, and economic significance of poorly known and previously unstudied cotton pests, including the cotton cicada, cotton aphids, and the cotton leafminer moth (Acrocercops bifasciata), among others. This research brought Yakhontov widespread and well-deserved recognition. Additionally, Yakhontov worked on short-term forecasting of aphid population abundance and outbreaks based on morphological characteristics (1956), insect parthenogenesis (1962), and the mathematical modelling of insect population dynamics (1963).

He wrote Insect Ecology (1964; second, revised edition 1969), the USSR's first university-level textbook on insect ecology. The first edition was approved by the Ministry of Higher and Secondary Specialized Education of the USSR as a teaching aid for university students, while the revised second edition was granted official textbook status for students majoring in biological sciences at Soviet universities.

Yakhontov conducted extensive faunistic research on the insect fauna of Uzbekistan. Together with Amina Davletshina, he published a series of studies (1954–1960) documenting the beetles (Buprestidae, Chrysomelidae, Tenebrionidae, Scarabaeidae, Meloidae), grasshoppers, and true bugs of the ancient Amu Darya delta. His other research documented dominant and high-density insect species of the Hungry Steppe (1962). He spent over 40 years preparing a comprehensive catalog of the insects of Uzbekistan, which remained unpublished due to his sudden death.

Yakhontov was also one of the Soviet Union's leading authorities on the order Thysanoptera (thrips) and the sole author of the chapters on this order in landmark Soviet reference works, including Keys to the Insects of the European Part of the USSR (edited by G. Ya. Bei-Bienko, 1964) and the multi-volume series The Animal World of the USSR (Volume 3: Steppe Zone, edited by E. N. Pavlovsky and B. S. Vinogradov, 1950). He also published the applied manual Tables for the Identification of Thrips Damaging Cultivated Plants in the USSR (1953). He also described one new genus and 15 new species of thrips.

=== Taxa described by Yakhontov ===
Yakhontov described 15 species of thrips (Thysanoptera), along with one genus, one subgenus, and one variety. Twelve of these species and the genus Pinaceothrips remain accepted, valid taxa as of 2026:

- Genus Pinaceothrips Yakhontov, 1956
- Dendrothrips saniishi Yakhontov, 1958
- Eremiothrips shirabudinensis (Yakhontov, 1929)
- Haplothrips ammodendronis Yakhontov, 1956
- Haplothrips arthrophyti Yakhontov, 1956
- Haplothrips celticola Yakhontov, 1955
- Mycterothrips tschirkunae (Yakhontov, 1961)
- Pezothrips brodskii (Yakhontov, 1937)
- Pinaceothrips monticola Yakhontov, 1956
- Thrips cardui Yakhontov, 1947
- Thrips iranicus Yakhontov, 1951
- Thrips pistaciae Yakhontov, 1951
- Thrips taraxaci Yakhontov & Stovichek, 1953

=== The Catalog of insects of Uzbekistan ===
Beginning in 1926, Yakhontov systematically worked on a comprehensive, multi-volume Catalog of Insects of Uzbekistan, tracking roughly 200 years of entomological data dating back to the earliest European explorers in Central Asia. By 1966, this project existed as a massive card catalog compiling references from over 5,000 domestic and foreign scientific publications. The first volume of the planned five-volume set was finalized for a scheduled 1971 release; however, due to Yakhontov’s death in 1970, this lifelong work remained unpublished. The subsequent fate of the card catalog remains unknown.

== Awards and legacy ==
- Honored Scientist of the Uzbek SSR (1960)
- Order of Lenin
- Three Honorary Certificates of the Presidium of the Supreme Soviet of the Uzbek SSR

Nine species of insects and mites have been named in his honor, including:

- Haplothrips yakhontovi Pelikan, 1963
- Liothrips jakhontovi Kreutzberg, 1955
- Etsuhoa yakhontovi Mamaev, 1969

During the Soviet era, scientific conferences commemorating Yakhontov were held annually in Tashkent.

== Selected publications ==
Yakhontov authored over 350 scientific and popular science publications. His principal works include:

- Insect Ecology (First Edition 1964; Revised Second Edition 1969)
- Pests of Agricultural Plants and Products of Central Asia and Their Control (1953)
- "Order Thysanoptera – thrips" in G. Ya. Bei-Bienko (ed.), Keys to the Insects of the European Part of the USSR (Vol. 1, 1964)
- "The Application of Coccinellidae in the Control of Agricultural Pests" in Useful and Harmful Insects of Uzbekistan (1960)
- The Animal Life of the Hungry Steppe: A Collection of Articles (editor, 1962)
- The Most Important Foreign Pests and Diseases of Cotton (1952)
- Alfalfa Leaf Weevil or Phytonomus: An Agricultural Monograph (1934)
- The Fauna of the Invertebrates Feeding on the Cotton Plant (Areas of the Distribution of Different Species in the World) (1931)
- Cotton Aphids (1931)
- List of Pests of Cultivated Plants in the Bukhara District (1929)
