= Amina Davletshina =

Soviet and Uzbek entomologist (1915–1995)

- Амина Галимовна Давлетшина
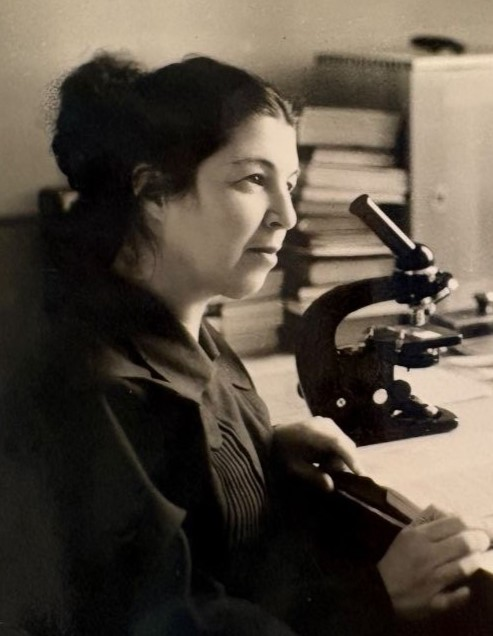
- Born: December 15, 1915; Orenburg, Russian Empire
- Died: September 8, 1995 (aged 79); Tashkent, Uzbekistan
- Resting place: Minor Cemetery, Tashkent, Uzbekistan
- Citizenship: Russian Empire, Soviet Union, Uzbekistan
- Education: Tashkent Pedagogical Institute
- Known for: Aphid research, termite research, research on Central Asian agricultural pests, biological control, desert insect faunistics
- Scientific career
- Fields: Agricultural entomology, pest control, Aphididae, Termitoidae, Desert entomofauna
- Workplaces: Institute of Zoology and Parasitology of the Academy of Sciences of the Uzbek SSR
- Author abbrev. (zoology): Davletshina

Amina Galimovna Davletshina (Russian: Амина Галимовна Давлетшина; 15 December 1915 – 8 September 1995) was a Soviet and Uzbek entomologist. She is regarded as one of the foundational figures in Central Asian study of aphids (aphidology). She conducted extensive research on Central Asian agricultural entomology, biological control agents and faunistics. Davletshina authored over 110 scientific publications and several major regional monographs, including Aphids of the Genus Aphis L. of the Fauna of Uzbekistan (1964) and Entomofauna of the South-West Kyzylkum (1979). She was a co-author of Insects of Uzbekistan (1993), the first comprehensive reference book on the entomofauna of Uzbekistan, and The World of Insects of Uzbekistan (1997), the first popular science book on the insects of Uzbekistan.

Davletshina's scientific career spanned for 50 years at the Institute of Zoology and Parasitology of the Academy of Sciences of Uzbekistan (1944-1994). Her academic credentials included a Candidate of Sciences (1949) and a title of Senior Researcher.

== Biography and career ==
=== Early life and family background ===
Amina Davletshina was born on 15 December 1915 in Orenburg, Russian Empire (now Russia), into a prominent Bashkir noble family. Her father, Gabdulgalim Davletshin, was an Islamic scholar, imam-khatib, and the first mudarris (director) of the prestigious Husainiya Madrasa in Orenburg, where he also taught geography, history, and Arabic. Founded in 1889 by the wealthy Tatar merchant philanthropists Ahmed and Mahmud Khusainov, Husainiya was one of the most progressive and well-endowed Islamic educational institutions in the Russian Empire, offering a curriculum that combined traditional theology with European natural sciences, mathematics, and languages.

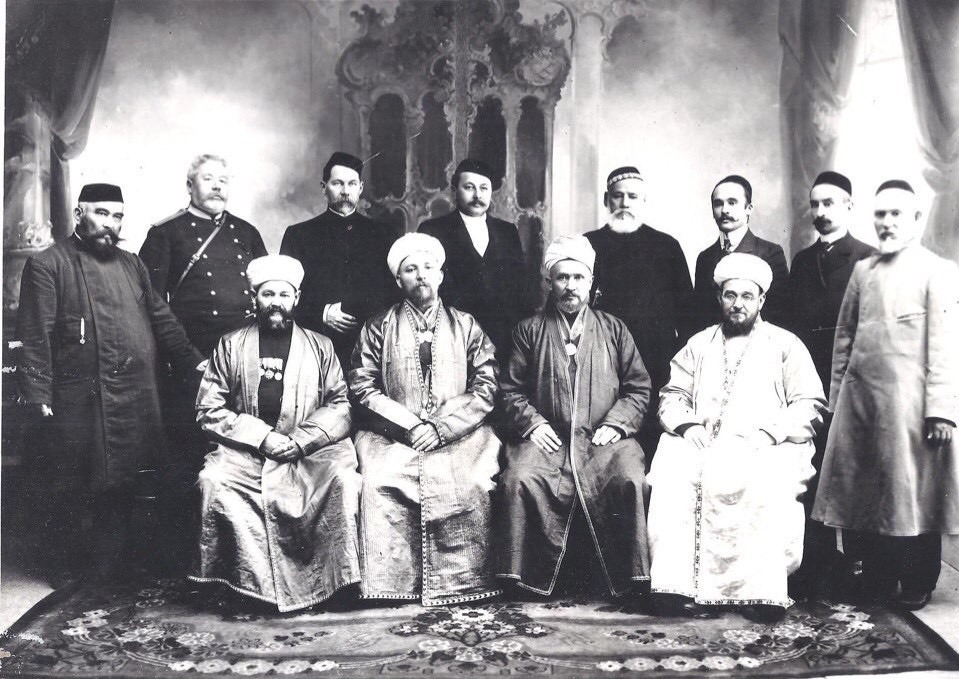
Gabdulgalim Davletshin (seated at the far right, in white), father of Amina Davletshina, among the trustees of the Husainiya Madrasa, 1909

Davletshina grew up in an affluent household with private tutors, tailors, and a family physician. She completed her early primary education at a Tatar school before transferring to a Russian school. She grew up multilingual, speaking Bashkir, Tatar, and Russian, and later acquired fluency in Uzbek after moving to Central Asia.

Following the October Revolution and the rise of Soviet rule in the 1920s, her family was targeted as members of the Muslim clergy and nobility. Their property and savings were confiscated, forcing the family to flee Orenburg for the Fergana Valley in Uzbekistan, settling first in Fergana and later in Andijan, where Davletshina took her first job at the postal service. The family eventually relocated to Tashkent.

In 1935, Davletshina married, but in 1936, her husband—a surgeon—was arrested on charges of counter-revolutionary activity during the Stalinist purges and sentenced to the Gulag.

=== Education and academic career ===
In 1936, Davletshina enrolled in the Faculty of Biology at the Tashkent Pedagogical Institute (now the Nizami National Pedagogical University of Uzbekistan), graduating from the Department of Zoology in 1940. Following her graduation, she remained at the institute as a researcher in the Department of Animal Physiology.

In 1944, she joined the Institute of Botany and Zoology of the Academy of Sciences of the Uzbek SSR as a postgraduate student under the supervision of the prominent entomologist Professor Vladimir Yakhontov. She completed her Candidate of Sciences degree (PhD equivalent) in 1949 with a dissertation focused on the insect communities of the archa (Juniperus) zone of the Turkestan Range.

Davletshina spent five decades at the Institute of Zoology and Parasitology of the Academy of Sciences of Uzbekistan (1944–1994), serving for most of her career as a Senior Researcher. During this period, she led two key research divisions: the Laboratory of Entomophages (1962–1970) and the Laboratory of Entomology (1973–1980).

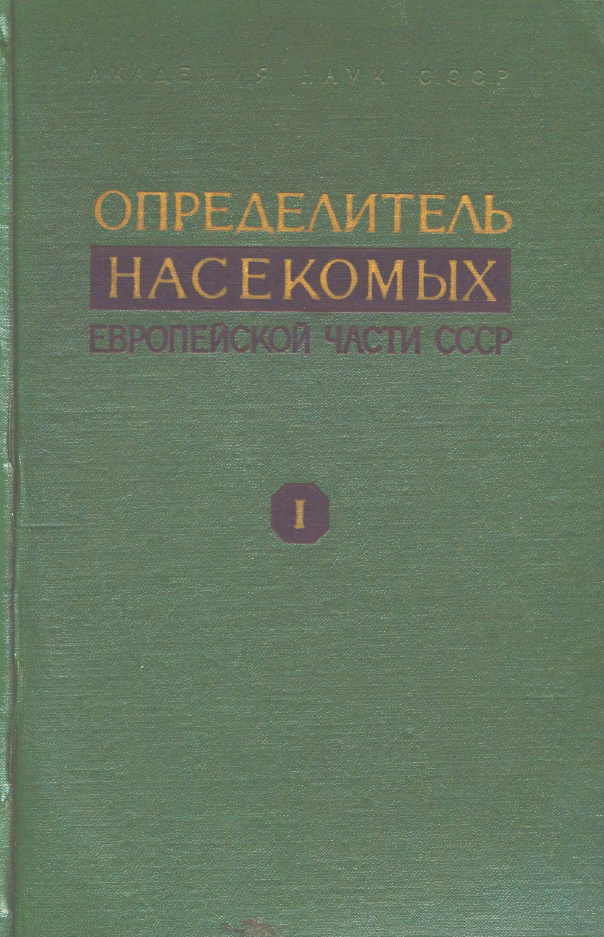
Cover of the landmark Soviet reference work Keys to the Insects of the European Part of the USSR, to which Davletshina contributed the section on the aphid genus Aphis

Davletshina contributed to the landmark multi-volume Keys to the Insects of the European Part of the USSR (Определитель насекомых европейской части СССР), issued by the Zoological Institute of the USSR Academy of Sciences under the general editorship of Grigory Bey-Bienko and considered to be "the most comprehensive guide to the insects of the USSR". In Volume I (1964), a 936-page fauna guide covering lower and hemimetabolous insect groups, she authored the identification keys for the aphid genus Aphis within Georgy Shaposhnikov's treatment of the suborder Aphidoidea. Davletshina was listed among the volume's co-authors alongside "outstanding Soviet scientists" from the Zoological Institute in Leningrad, Moscow State University, and the Polish Academy of Sciences (including her research adviser, Vladimir Yakhontov, who authored the Thysanoptera section).

Davletshina was a prolific researcher, publishing over 110 scientific papers, 3 monographs, and multiple applied agricultural guides over the course of her career. She concentrated her studies on the ecology, seasonal dynamics, and biological control of agricultural pests in arid ecosystems and agroecosystems across Uzbekistan, particularly in newly reclaimed areas such as the Golodnaya and Jizzakh Steppes. Her research established new data on the biology and species composition of insect pests affecting cotton, alfalfa, vegetable and melon crops, as well as stored agricultural products, and included the development of methods for the laboratory rearing of the cotton bollworm and Trichogramma. Beyond her studies of aphids, her publications extensively addressed darkling beetle communities (Tenebrionidae), ground beetles (Carabidae), and beneficial aphidophagous insects and parasitoids (family Aphidiidae). She also authored several practical handbooks for agricultural practitioners, including Cotton Aphids and Their Control (1953) and Beneficial and Harmful Insects of Cotton (1979).

For years, Davletshina served as the chief editor for multi-author monographs and academic collections published by the Fan ("science" in Uzbek) Publishing House of the Academy of Sciences of the Uzbek SSR. Her editorial works focused on pest management, biological control, and regional fauna, including the two-volume collection Ecology and Biology of Animals of Uzbekistan (1975), Ecology and Biology of Entomophages of Agricultural Pests in Uzbekistan (1974), Cotton Pests and Their Entomophages in Uzbekistan (1986), Flea Beetles Coleoptera, Chrysomelidae, Halticinae: Identification Key to Genera and Pest Species (1975), Orthopteran insects of the Karshi Steppe (1982) and Cotton Protection in the Jizzakh Region (1980).

Davletshina represented Soviet entomology at international scientific forums. In 1965, she served as a Soviet delegate at the 1st International Symposium on the Ecology of Aphidophagous Insects in Liblice, Czechoslovakia. She also participated in the 13th International Congress of Entomology in Moscow in 1968, as well as the 7th Congress of the All-Union Entomological Society in Leningrad in 1974, and the All-Union Conference on Termite Research in Ashgabat in 1960.

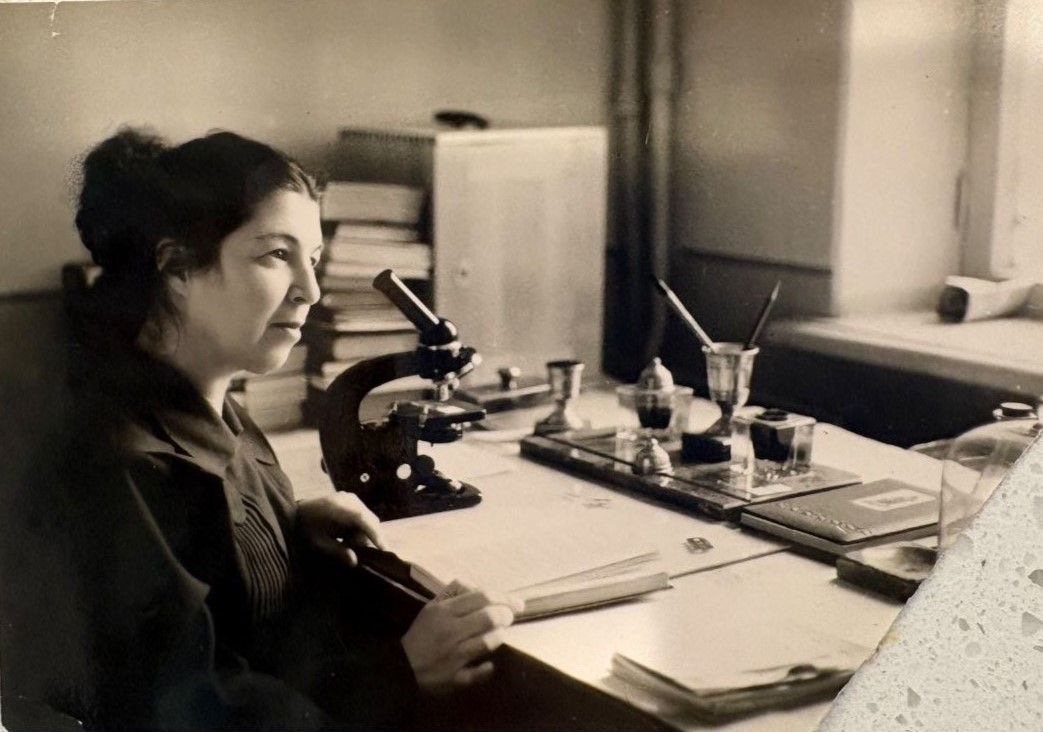
Amina Davletshina in her office at the Institute of Zoology and Parasitology of the Academy of Sciences of the Uzbek SSR, Tashkent, c. 1960s

Throughout her career, Davletshina supervised postgraduate research and advised candidate dissertations in entomology, often collaborating with leading Soviet institutions such as Saint Petersburg State University and the Zoological Institute of the Russian Academy of Sciences. Her doctoral advisees included A. S. Bogolyubova (1974, studying the parasitoid wasp Habrobracon hebetor as a biological control agent for the cotton bollworm), A. Dadamirzaev (1979, co-advised with Oleg Kryzhanovsky on ground beetle ecology in Uzbekistan), and D. B. Daminova (1992, co-advised with E. S. Sugonyaev on hoverflies in Uzbek agroecosystems).

Beyond her research at the Institute, Davletshina was an active member of the Uzbekistan Entomological Society and served as its treasurer. Davletshina retired from the Institute of Zoology in 1994, while remaining active in mentoring early-career entomologists and advising graduate students.

She died on 8 September 1995 and was buried at the Minor Cemetery in Tashkent.

== Scientific contributions ==
=== Aphid taxonomy and systematics ===
Aphidology was Davletshina's primary area of research. In 1964, she published her influential monograph, Aphids of the Genus Aphis L. of the Fauna of Uzbekistan (Тли рода Aphis L., фауны Узбекистана). In the book on the history of the Institute of Zoology and Parasitology of Uzbekistan (1992), Davletshina's monograph was listed among the “most significant works” published by the institute. Modern taxonomic reviews, such as the 2024 Annotated Checklist of the Aphids of Uzbekistan, recognize Amina Davletshina alongside Valerian Nevsky and Georgy Shaposhnikov as one of the foundational figures in Central Asian aphidology.

Davletshina described four new species of aphids in the genus Aphis:

- Aphis (Aphis) chilopsidi Davletshina, 1964
- Aphis (Aphis) mamonthovae Davletshina, 1964
- Aphis (Aphis) thecomae Davletshina, 1964
- Aphis crispi Davletshina, 1964 (later treated as a junior synonym)

=== Desert entomofauna ===
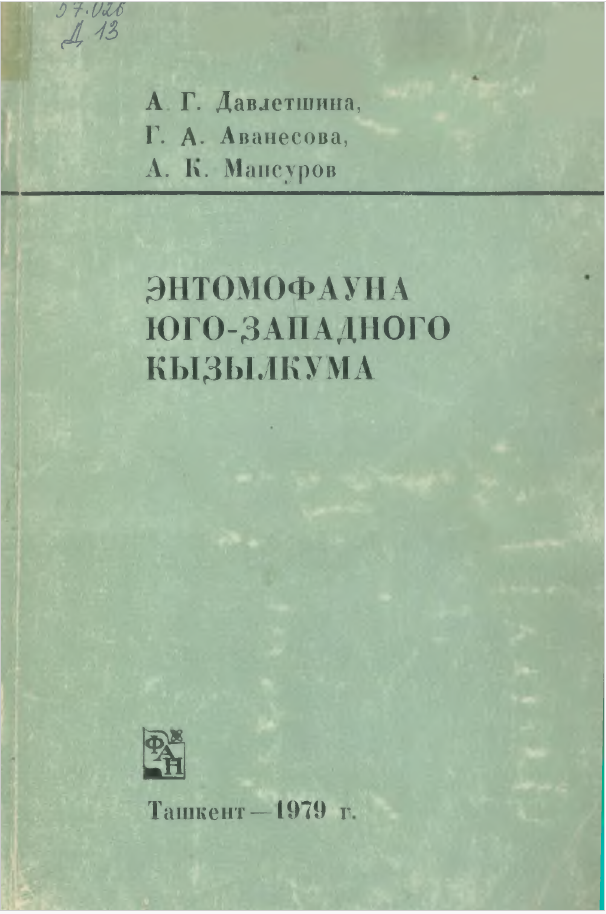
Cover of Entomofauna of the South-West Kyzylkum (1979), a major regional faunistic monograph co-authored by Davletshina

Davletshina conducted extensive long-term research on the insect ecology of the deserts, including Kyzylkum Desert, and the ancient delta of the Amu Darya river. In 1979, she co-authored the comprehensive monograph Entomofauna of the South-West Kyzylkum, which detailed the structure, biogeography, and ecological relationships of insect communities across stony, gypsum, and sandy desert habitats. Earlier in her career, she carried out a series of foundational faunistic surveys alongside her research adviser, Professor Vladimir Yakhontov, and published a core study on darkling beetle (Tenebrionidae) microhabitat distribution in Zoologichesky Zhurnal (1967). She also contributed to research on desert vertebrates, providing expert insect identifications for the diet studies on agamid lizards, racerunners (Eremias), and hedgehogs.

=== Termite ecology and agricultural entomology ===
Davletshina carried out pioneering research on the Turkestan termite (Anacanthotermes turkestanicus), a major structural and agricultural pest in Central Asia. She published extensively on termite control methods, authoring two monographs: Termites and Their Control Measures (1963) and Termites and Their Inflicted Damage (1966). Her work presented field-tested control strategies—including deep soil cultivation and targeted chemical treatments—which she shared at major scientific forums, such as the All-Union Conference on Termite Research in Ashgabat in 1960.

She also focused extensively on biological control and entomophagous insects (predators and parasitoids of crop pests), publishing works on beneficial species in cotton and alfalfa agroecosystems to promote natural pest regulation as an alternative to chemical pesticides. Her contributions to sustainable agriculture included, among others, the monographs Entomophages of the Principal Cotton Pests of Uzbekistan (1972), Beneficial Insects Are Harvest Protectors (1976), Entomophages of Cotton Aphids (1978), and Dipteran Crop Protectors (1981).

=== Popular science and reference works ===
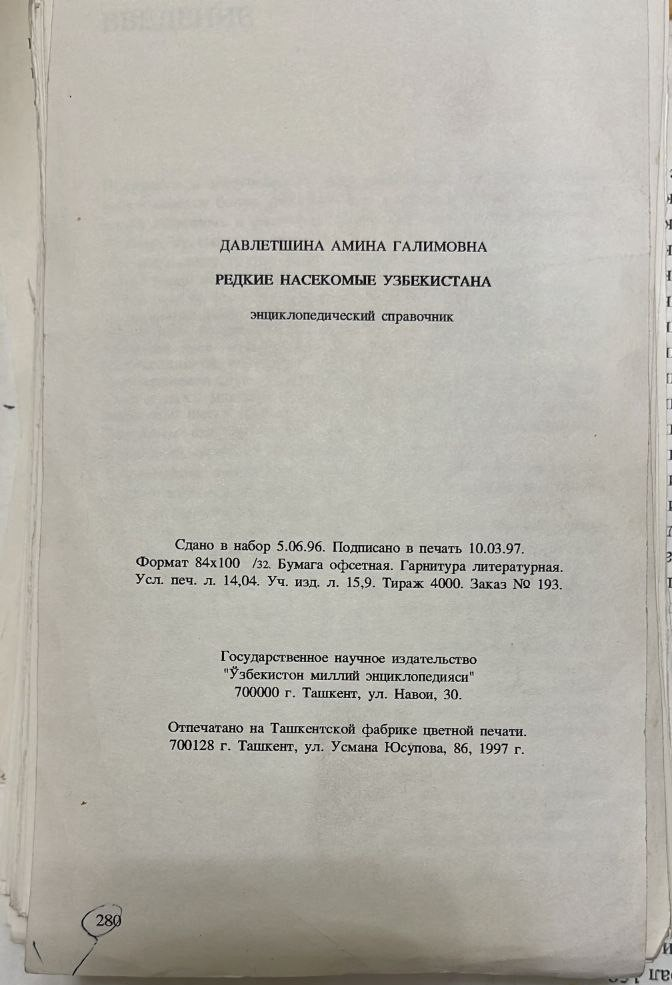
Colophon of Davletshina's unpublished Rare Insects of Uzbekistan: An Encyclopedic Handbook, signed for press in March 1997

Later in her career, Davletshina co-authored major reference books aimed at synthesizing knowledge of Uzbekistan's insect diversity:

- Insects of Uzbekistan (Насекомые Узбекистана, 1993) – The first comprehensive reference manual covering 34 insect orders in the region, co-authored with L. A. Azimov, A. A. Bekuzin, and M. K. Kadyrova.
- The World of Insects of Uzbekistan (Мир насекомых Узбекистана, 1997) – The first popular science work on Uzbekistan's entomology, co-authored with V. A. Moiseev.

Davletshina’s final major effort was Rare Insects of Uzbekistan: An Encyclopedic Handbook (Редкие насекомые Узбекистана — энциклопедический справочник). Prepared for publication by the State Scientific Publishing House "Oʻzbekiston milliy ensiklopediyasi" (National Encyclopedia of Uzbekistan), it was signed for press in March 1997. Designed as a substantial reference work exceeding 200 pages with illustrations and a planned press run of 4,000 copies, the book ultimately remained unpublished due to the financial crisis that crippled academic publishing in post-Soviet Uzbekistan during the late 1990s.

== Awards and honors ==
Several insect species have been named in honor of Davletshina by fellow entomologists:

- Stefaniola davletshinae (Marikovskii, 1957) – A species of gall midge (Cecidomyiidae).
- Aphis davletshinae Hille Ris Lambers, 1966 – An aphid species (later treated as a synonym).

In 1993–1994, Davletshina was awarded a research grant under the "Biodiversity" program organized by the International Science Foundation (Soros Foundation) and the Russian Academy of Natural Sciences (RANS).

Davletshina received several Soviet and Uzbek state and commemorative awards over the course of her career, including:

- Shuhrat Medal (1994)
- Medal "Veteran of Labour" (1978)
- Jubilee Medal "For Valiant Labour. In Commemoration of the 100th Anniversary of the Birth of Vladimir Ilyich Lenin" (1970)
- Jubilee Medal "50 Years of Victory over Fascism in the 1941–1945 War" (1995)
- Badge "Winner of the Socialist Competition of 1974" (1975)
