= GSU =

GSU may refer to:

== Universities ==
- Galatasaray University, in Istanbul, Turkey
- Gavar State University, in Armenia
- Georgia Southern University, in Statesboro, Georgia, United States
- Georgia State University, in Atlanta, Georgia, United States
- Gombe State University, in Nigeria
- Governors State University, in University Park, Illinois, United States
- Grambling State University, in Grambling, Louisiana, United States
- Guimaras State University, in Buenavista, Guimaras, Philippines
- Gulistan State University, in Gulistan, Uzbekistan

== Other uses ==
- Azaza Airport, serving Gedaref, Sudan
- Gang Suppression Unit, a special unit of the Belize Police Department
- General Service Unit, a Kenyan paramilitary special forces unit.
- Genealogical Society of Utah
- Generator step-up transformer
- Geographically Separate Unit, in the United States military
- George Sherman Union, a building at Boston University
- Goldsmiths Students' Union, University of London
- Greater Sudbury Utilities, a Canadian power utility
