= Rahim Hakimov =

Uzbek politician (born 1983)

Rahim Rasuljonovich Hakimov

Deputy Speaker of Legislative Chamber of Uzbekistan
- Incumbent
- Assumed office 18 November 2024

Personal details
- Born: 2 January 1983 (age 43) Chust, Namangan Region, Uzbek SSR, Soviet Union
- Education: Tashkent State University of Law

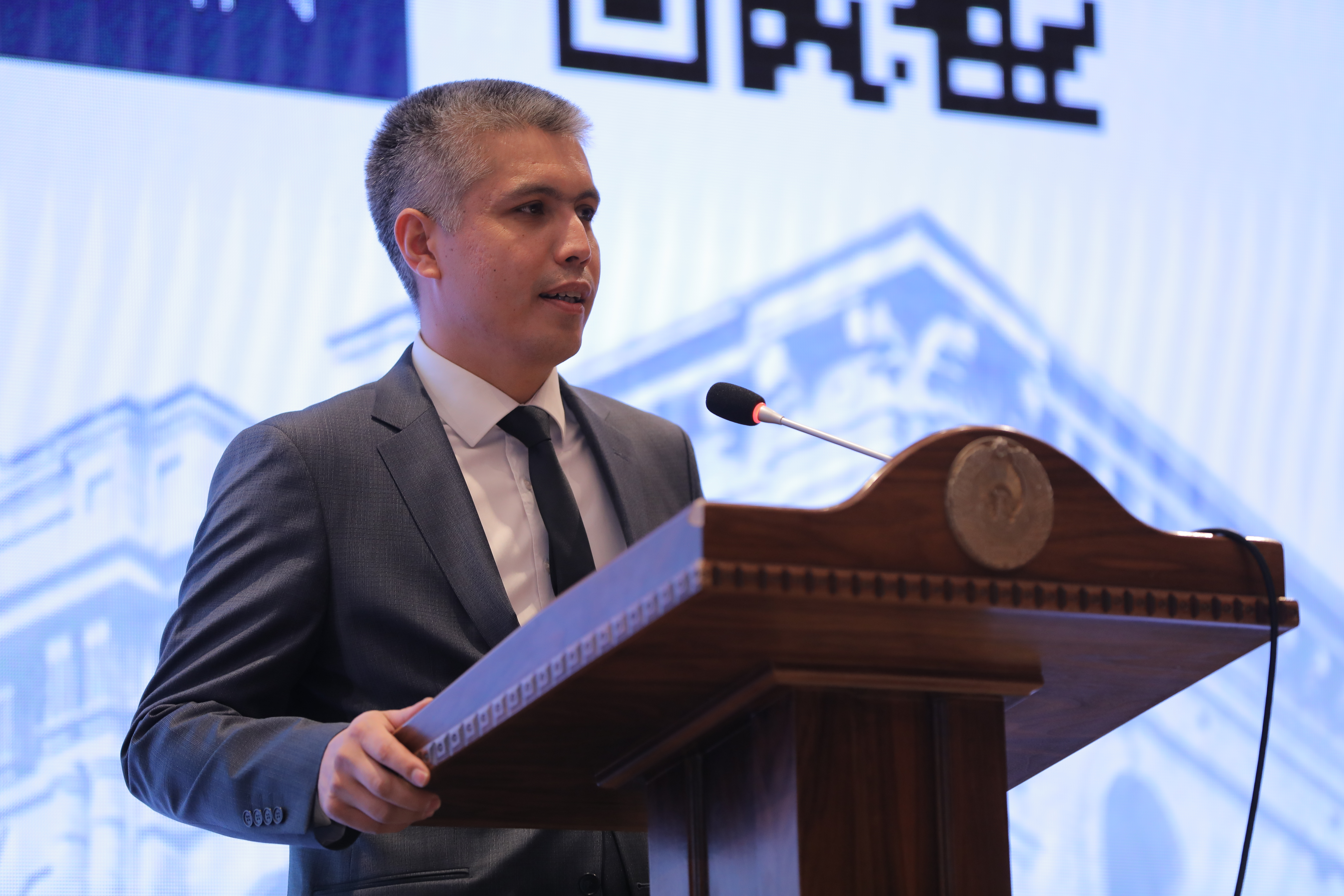
Hakimov in 2022

Rahim Rasuljonovich Hakimov (born 2 January 1983) is an Uzbek politician, jurisprudence scholar, member of the Legislative Chamber of the Oliy Majlis (2015–2019, elected again in 2024). In accordance with the 19 September 2019 Resolution of the President of the Republic of Uzbekistan, appointed Deputy Minister of Justice of the Republic of Uzbekistan — Rector of Tashkent State University of Law. In accordance with the PQ-5156 Resolution of the President of the Republic of Uzbekistan on June 21, 2021, appointed Deputy Minister of Higher and Secondary Specialized Education for science and innovation. Under the Decree of the President of the Republic of Uzbekistan, from December 2022 worked as the First Deputy Advisor to the President of the Republic of Uzbekistan. From November 18, 2024, serves as Deputy Speaker of the Legislative Chamber of the Oliy Majlis of the Republic of Uzbekistan. Holds the title of the 1st-degree Justice Advisor, DSc in Law, Professor.

== Biography ==
Hakimov was born in 1983 in the city of Chust in the Namangan region of Uzbekistan. In 1997, he graduated from Lomonosov school No. 3, and in 1999 he graduated from the boarding school for talented children of Chust District. In 2003, he graduated the law faculty of Namangan State University with honors (bachelor's degree), in 2005 — Tashkent State Institute of Law (master's degree). In the same year, he was awarded with the state scholarship of the President of the Republic of Uzbekistan in the field of "Law and international relations".

== Career ==
From 2005 to 2015, he worked in various positions at the Institute for Monitoring Current Legislation under the President of the Republic of Uzbekistan, having made his way from a specialist to the head of the department for monitoring legislation in the field of state and public construction.

From 2008 to 2010, he combined being an associate professor of legal Sciences at Tax Academy under the State Tax Committee of the Republic of Uzbekistan. In 2012-2015 – an associate professor of "Fundamentals of state-building and governance" Department at Academy of Public Administration under the President of the Republic of Uzbekistan (APA).

In November 2014, he was nominated as a candidate for Parliament from the liberal democratic party of Uzbekistan, according to the results of the election, he was elected as a deputy to the legislative chamber of Oliy Majlis of the Republic of Uzbekistan. He was a member of the Committee on Security and Defense, and later headed it.

Being a Deputy, from December 2017, he also headed the Institute of legislative problems and parliamentary research under Oliy Majlis. By the Decree of the President of the Republic of Uzbekistan dated September 2019, he was appointed as the Deputy Minister of justice of the Republic of Uzbekistan – rector of Tashkent State University of Law and thus, he prematurely resigned from the Legislative Chamber.

By the Presidential Decree No. PP-5156 of June 21, 2021, he was appointed as a Deputy Minister of Higher and Specialized Secondary Education of the Republic of Uzbekistan for Science and Innovation.

By the Presidential Decree of 24 December 2022, he was appointed as a First deputy of President Advisor.

=== Legislative chamber deputy ===
As a member and then Chairman of the Defense and Security Committee of the legislative chamber of the Oliy Majlis, he was responsible for the preparation and adoption of 30 bills, initiated 12 bills, took an active part in the development and adoption of the Defense doctrine of the Republic of Uzbekistan, the laws of the Republic of Uzbekistan "On defense" (new edition), "On weapons" and others.

He headed the inter-parliamentary group of Oliy Majlis for establishing cooperation with the Parliament of India, and was a member of similar inter-parliamentary groups for establishing cooperation with the parliaments of China and Canada.

He is a member of the commission for the implementation of priority areas for improving the system of state and public construction, established in accordance with the Decree of the President of the Republic of Uzbekistan dated February 7, 2017 "On The strategy of actions for further development of the Republic of Uzbekistan". As a member of this commission, he was directly involved in the development of a number of laws, including the constitutional law "On the constitutional court of the Republic of Uzbekistan", the laws "On parliamentary control” and "On public control".

He is also included in the members of the commission for the implementation of the concept of normative activity approved by the decree of the President of the Republic of Uzbekistan dated August 8, 2018.

=== Research institute director ===
Hakimov actively participated in the creation of the parliamentary research Institute. He became the first Director of the Institute of Legislative Problems and Parliamentary Research under Oliy Majlis. While serving as Director of this Institute (December 2017 – September 2019), he supervised the preparation of 64 draft laws and more than 185 analytical materials aimed at solving problems of law enforcement practice.

=== University rector ===
Having started working as the rector of Tashkent State University of Law, he launched a process of reforms aimed at modernizing the educational process and internationalizing education, the main ones are:

- implementation of the European Credit systems ECTS (European Credit Transfer and Accumulation System);
- initiating the project “electronic University" (E-University), which provides for the transition to electronic document management and digitalization of the educational process;
- creation of the Legal Tech laboratory under University, aimed at active development and implementation of new information technologies and systems in law;
- approval of the Anticorruption program aimed at creating a "Zero tolerance" for corruption at University;
- creation of a mediation and alternative dispute resolution center at University;
- introduction of university scholarships and grants for students of Tashkent State University of Law;
- creation of a system for paying tuition fees and related expenses for prospective bachelor's and master's degree graduates and University employees in master's and doctoral programs of foreign educational and scientific institutions;
- implementation of joint educational programs for training lawyer employees (double degree) with foreign partners (currently the Republic of Belarus and Kazakhstan);
- opening of the center for German law and comparative legal research aimed at training qualified legal personnel with knowledge of German language, in cooperation with the University of Regensburg (Federal Republic of Germany) in 2020;
- drastic improvement of Academic Lyceum under Tashkent State University of Law and law colleges;
- membership of university in the International Association of Universities (IAU), International Association of Law schools (IALS), European Association of Law school (ELFA) and the International University Association Magna Charta Universitatum Observatory.

While he was a rector, Tashkent State University of Law for the first time entered the top 500 universities in the world according to the British magazine The Times Higher Education, taking 401st place (the best place among the universities of Uzbekistan and Central Asia) among thousands of universities from 94 regions and countries.

Activities as First Deputy Advisor to the President of the Republic of Uzbekistan on Socio-Political Development

Since December 2022, he has been working as First Deputy Advisor to the President of the Republic of Uzbekistan on Socio-Political Development.

Activities as Deputy Speaker of the Legislative Chamber of the Oliy Majlis of the Republic of Uzbekistan.

From November 18, 2024, he has been working as Deputy Speaker of the Legislative Chamber of the Oliy Majlis of the Republic of Uzbekistan.

== Scientific activities and achievements ==
In 2009, he successfully defended his PhD thesis on "Parliament in the system of state power: problems of theory and practice" and received a PhD in law.

In 2014, he was awarded the academic title of associate Professor in the specialty of "Constitutional law. Administrative law. Financial and customs law".

In 2018, he successfully defended his doctoral dissertation on: "Improvement of legal mechanisms to ensure balance between the branches of state power" and received the degree of DSc of law.

In 2020, he was awarded the academic title of Professor in the specialty of "Constitutional law. Administrative law. Financial and customs law".

He has prepared 3 monographs, 24 scientific and practical manuals devoted to improving lawmaking and law enforcement practice. In total, he is the author of about 100 scientific publications.

He is also the editor-in-chief of the scientific and practical legal journal Yuridik Fanlar Axborotnomasi – Вестник юридических наук – Review of Law Sciences.

In July 2021, he became an honorary professor at Tashkent State Law University.

== Main works ==
- "Basic principles and stages of reforming the parliamentary system, strengthening its role in state building in Uzbekistan" (2009);
- "Parliament in the system of state power: problems of theory and practice" (2009);
- "Further improvement of the legal framework of citizens' self-government bodies " (2013);
- "Parliamentary law" (2014);
- "Development of the legal framework for parliamentary control in Uzbekistan: main provisions of the law of the Republic of Uzbekistan "On parliamentary control" (2016);
- "Constitutional law" (2016);
- "Improving legal mechanisms to ensure balance between branches of government" (2018);
- "The President's initiatives are an important factor in strengthening parliamentary control" (2019);
- "Constitutional and legal status of the Oliy Majlis of the Republic of Uzbekistan" (2020).

== Awards ==
- Breastplate “O‘zbekiston mustaqilligiga 20 yil” (2011);
- Breastplate “O‘zbekiston mustaqilligiga 25 yil” (2016);
- Breastplate “O‘zbekiston konstitutsiyasiga 25 yil” (2017);
- Breastplate “O‘zbekiston konstitutsiyasiga 30 yil” (2021).

== Family ==
He is married and has a daughter and two sons.

== Social media ==
https://t.me/rahimjon_hakimov https://www.facebook.com/rahim.hakimov.9

== See also ==
- Хакимов Рахим Расулжонович
- Rahim Rasuljonovich Hakimov
