= Karakalpak State University =

Public university in Nukus, Republic of Karakalpakstan in Uzbekistan

- Berdaq atındaǵı Qaraqalpaq mámleketlik universiteti Berdaq nomidagi Qoraqalpoq davlat universiteti
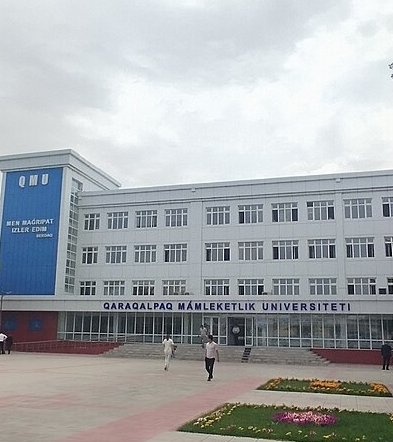
- Karakalpak State University
- Former name: Taras Shevchenko Nukus State University
- Type: public university
- Established: 1976
- Rector: Reimov Ahmed Mambetkarimovich
- Academic staff: 575
- Students: 6000
- Location: Nukus, Karakalpakstan, 230100, Uzbekistan; 42.452°N 59.628°E
- Website: karsu.uz
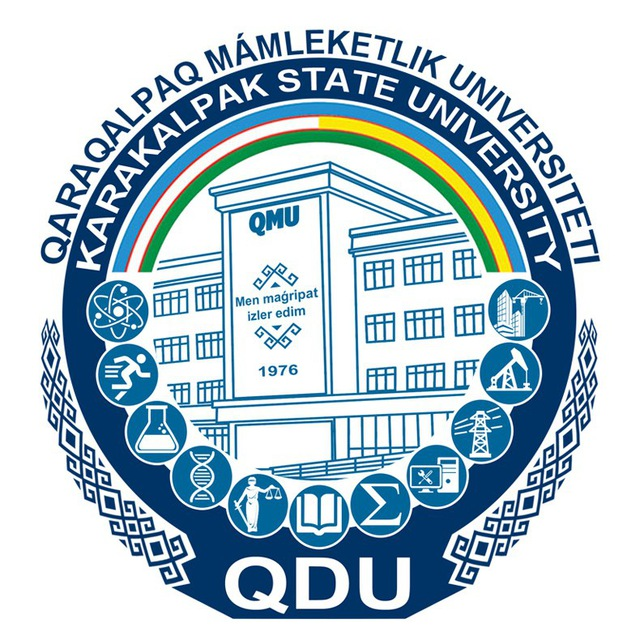

University rankings

Regional – Overall
- QS Asia: 621-640 (2025)

The Karakalpak State University named after Berdakh (Karakalpak: Berdaq atındaǵı Qaraqalpaq mámleketlik universiteti, Uzbek: Berdaq nomidagi Qoraqalpoq davlat universiteti) is a public university in Nukus, capital of autonomous Republic of Karakalpakstan in north-western Uzbekistan. The university is flagship institution of higher education of Karakalpakstan and its biggest academic and research centre.

The institution is named after the poet Berdakh. In 2025 QS Asian University Rankings - Central Asia the university was ranked as the 39th in Central Asia. Karakalpak State University has established cooperation agreements with universities and research centres in the United States, United Kingdom, France, Germany, Sweden, Bulgaria, Malaysia, China, Turkey, Russia, Ukraine and other countries. The university's scientific initiatives focus on sustainable practices and environmental science, tackling regional ecological issues, including the desiccation of the Aral Sea.

== History ==
In September 1935, the first higher education institution in Karakalpakstan was established as a teacher's institute. In 1944, it was restructured into the Karakalpak State Pedagogical Institute.

The idea of establishing the university in the Karakalpak Autonomous Soviet Socialist Republic emerged in the late 1950s when there was a growing demand for skilled specialists to support the region's economic and cultural development. Initially proposed by the academician S. Kamalov at a regional conference of the Communist Party of Uzbekistan in 1958, the plan gained momentum in the 1960s.

After extensive efforts by local leaders and the administration of the existing Karakalpak State Pedagogical Institute, the Central Committee issued a decree on February 26, 1974, to create Nukus State University. The new university was named after Taras Shevchenko, Ukrainian poet, writer, artist, public and political figure. This decision was supported by further governmental decrees in 1974, leading to the official establishment of the university on June 14, 1974.

In 1992, the institution was renamed Karakalpak State University. That same year, it joined the International Association of Universities.

== See also ==
- List of universities in Uzbekistan
