= Urgench State University =

University in Urgench, Uzbekistan

- Urganch Davlat Universiteti (UrDU)
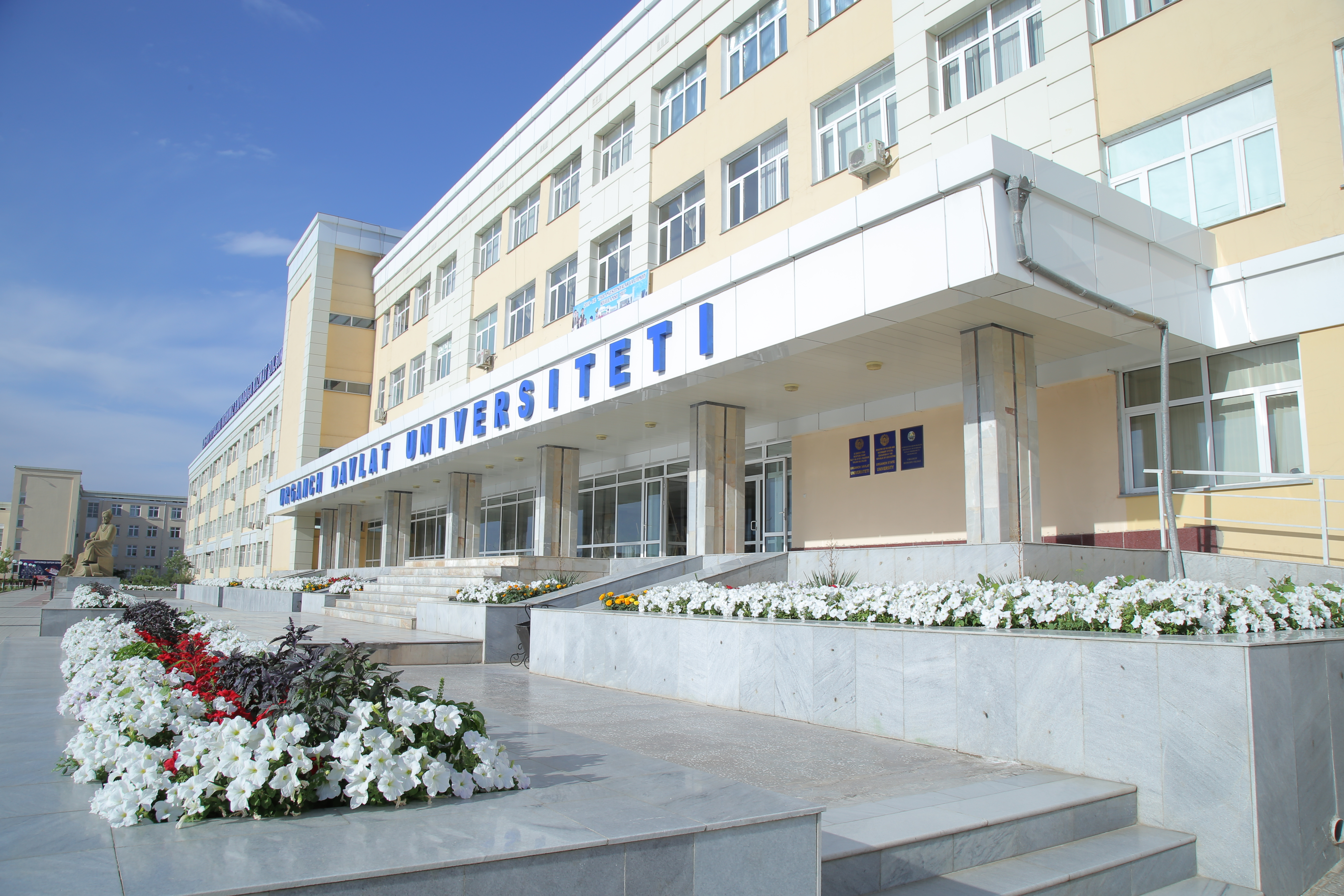
- Former names: 1942—1991: Khorezm State Pedagogical Institute; 1991—2017: Urgench State University after named Al-Khorezmi; Since 2025: Urgench State University named after Abu Rayhan Biruni
- Type: Public
- Established: 1942
- President: Doctor Bakhrom Ismoilovich Abdullayev
- Academic staff: over 1000
- Administrative staff: over 800
- Students: over 30 000
- Location: 14, Khamid Alimdjan, Urgench, Khorezm, 220100, Uzbekistan
- Campus: Republic of Uzbekistan, 220100, Urgench, Khamid Alimdjan, 14.
- Language: Uzbek, Russian
- Website: www.urdu.uz

Urgench State University (UrSU) (Uzbek: Urganch Davlat Universiteti (UrDU); Russian: Ургенчский государственный университет) is a major university in Urgench, Uzbekistan established by the decree of the President of the Republic of Uzbekistan Islam Karimova dated 1 September 1992 in the city of Urgench. The university is commonly known as Urgench University (in Uzbek Urganch universiteti)

== History ==
Urgench State University is one of the oldest universities of the Republic of Uzbekistan.

The university was initially organized in 1942 as the Khorezm State Pedagogical Institute. In 1991–2017, the university was named after great mathematician and philosopher Al-Khorezmi (alternative transliteration Muhammad ibn Musa al-Khwarizmi) as Urgench State University after named Al-Khorezmi.

In 2017, the Urgench State University after named Al-Khorezmi was finally renamed the Urgench State University, a name it keeps to date. Since 2025, the University has been named after Abu Rayhan Biruni.

The rector of the university is Dr. Bakhrom Ismoilovich Abdullayev since 2016.

The university is located in Khorezm, a region in northwestern Uzbekistan, one of the historical, cultural centres of the country. The region is popular with tourists because of the city of Khiva, which are listed as UNESCO World Heritage sites.

Urgench State University provide a scientific and educational environment more than 30000 students. More than 160 educational programs is developed by academic staff of the University and successfully implemented for bachelors, masters and doctorate students in the following fields of knowledge: Engineering, Mathematics, IT, History, Economics, Chemistry, Biology, Biotechnology, Food Science, Pedagogy and many others.

== Faculties ==
Currently, the university comprises the following faculties:

- Physics and Mathematics
- Foreign Philology
- Philology and Art
- Natural and agricultural sciences
- Sports activity, pedagogy and psychology
- Socio-economic sciences
- Technics
- Chemical technology

== International partners ==
Urganch State University has signed agreements and cooperated with more than 100 higher education institutions of 30 countries in order to expand the geography of cooperation with foreign higher education institutions in the field of education and science.

Professors and teachers of higher education institutions of a number of countries, such as Russia, the USA, Ukraine, Poland, Slovenia, Korea, Iran and the Republic of Belarus are involved in the educational process.

As university has established strong ties and collaboration with foreign universities, a lot of international projects have been implemented and are being constantly evolving at UrSU such as, CLASS, EPCA, ELBA, IRES, 3D Digital Silk Road, English for STEM, SUMRICA and ICM projects with the universities such as University of L'Aquila, University of Porto, Keele University, University of Padova, University of Cantabria, Weihenstephan-Triesdorf University of Applied Science, University of Agricultural Sciences and Veterinary Medicine of Cluj-Napoca, University of Santiago de Compostela, University of West Attica, Poitiers University, University of Primorska, Karamanoglu Mehmetbey University.

== See also ==
- List of universities in Uzbekistan
