= Zarmed University =

University in Bukhara, Uzbekistan

- Logo of Zarmed University
- Type: Private university
- Established: 2022; 4 years ago
- President: Dilshod Shukurlaev
- Rector: Akbarkhon Dalerov Dilshodovich
- Students: 5400
- Location: Bukhara, Bukhara Region, Uzbekistan
- Campus: 7.4 acres (3.0 ha)
- Other campuses: Samarkand
- Website: Zarmed University website

Zarmed University is a private university in Bukhara, Uzbekistan. Founded in 2022, it is the first private university established in Bukhara. The university was founded by entrepreneur and philanthropist Dilshod Dalerovich Shukurlaev. It has two campuses - in Bukhara and in Samarkand.

== History ==
Zarmed University was established as Turon Zarmed University by medical entrepreneur Dilshod Shukurlaev in August 2022. He was instrumental in establishing the joint Uzbek-Indian project Zarmed - Pratiksha Hospital in Samarkand in 2021. Shukurlaev was inspired to found the university after the visit of the President of Uzbekistan, Shavkat Mirziyoyev.

== Campuses ==
Zarmed University has two campuses - in Samarkand and in Bukhara.

=== Samarkand ===
The Samarkand campus of Zarmed University was established in 2019. It is located on Khodzha Akhror Vali Street and covers 2.8 hectares (6.9 acres), featuring 10 dedicated blocks for academics, administration, and student services. This campus supports the university's growing academic departments and plays a role in delivering professional education across fields like finance, engineering, philology, and psychology.

=== Bukhara ===
The Bukhara campus of Zarmed University was established in 2022 after the Samarkand campus to expand its academic and training facilities. Located on Kayum Murtazaev Street, this campus spans an area of 3 hectares (7.4 acres) and includes 9 academic and administrative blocks. Since its establishment, the Bukhara campus has served as the main hub for medical and healthcare-related studies, offering modern teaching facilities, laboratories, and clinical training opportunities. It plays a central role in providing practical education and hands-on experience for students in fields such as medicine, dentistry, and pharmacy.

== Academics ==
Zarmed University consists of three faculties that offer a range of programs in various disciplines. The faculties and their respective areas of study include:

- Faculty of Medical Treatment
- Faculty of Pharmacy
- Faculty of Dentistry
- Faculty of Finance and financial technology
- Faculty of Economy
- Faculty of Engineering construction
- Faculty of Computer science and programming technologies
- Faculty of History (by countries and directions)
- Faculty of Philology (English language)
- Faculty of Philology (Russian language)
- Faculty of Philology (Korean)
- Faculty of Philology (Turkish)
- Faculty of Pedagogy & Psychology
- Faculty of Pre-school Education
- Faculty of Primary Education
- Faculty of Sport

== Partnerships ==
Zarmed cooperates and has partnerships with international universities and institutions like Temple University (USA), Hana General Hospital (Republic of Korea), Apollo Hospitals (India), Almazov National Medical Research Centre (Russia), Belarusian State Medical University, University Hospital Sharjah (UAE), Acibadem University (Turkey), Baskent University Healthcare Group (Turkey) and Voronezh State University (Russia).
