= Zoologicheskii Zhurnal =

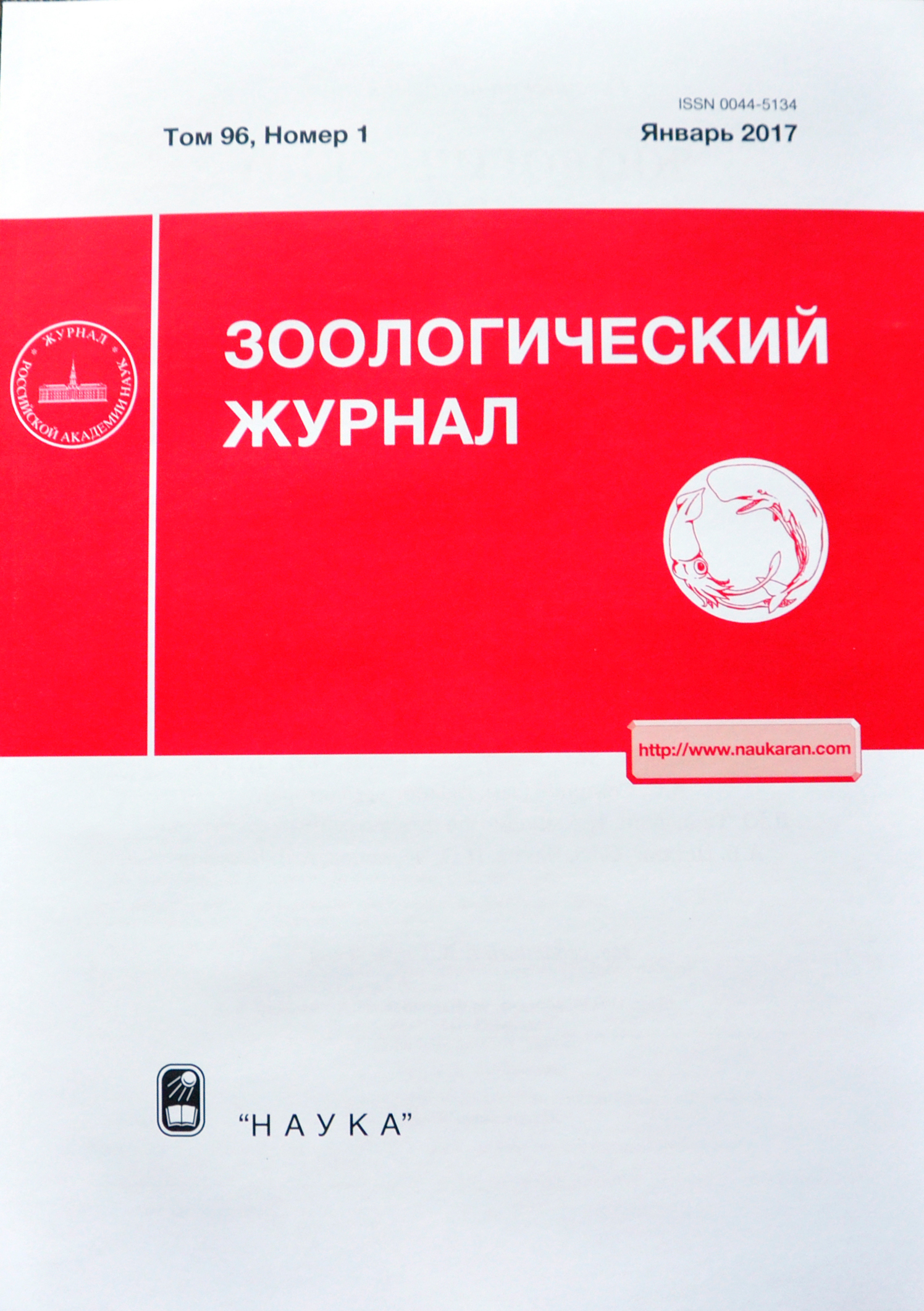
- Discipline: Zoology
- Language: Russian
- Edited by: Yu. I. Chernov

Publication details
- History: 1916-present
- Publisher: Russian Academy of Sciences (Russia)
- Frequency: Monthly

Standard abbreviations
- ISO 4: Zool. Zh.

Indexing
- ISSN: 0044-5134

Links
- Journal homepage; Online access to volumes 1-3 (1916-1922) at Biodiversity Heritage Library

Zoologicheskii Zhurnal (Russian: Зоологический Журнал, Zoological Journal) is a peer-reviewed scientific journal published in Russian covering research in zoology. The journal was established in 1916 by Aleksei Severtsov.
