= Pavel Iustinovich Marikovsky =

Russian entomologist and arachnologist

Pavel Iustinovich Marikovsky (Russian: Павел Иустинович Мариковский; July 28, 1912 – November 10, 2008) was a Russian entomologist, arachnologist, and popular science author known for his research in ants and the insect fauna of Kazakhstan and Central Asia, as well as over 60 popular science books, which made him one of the most popular science promoters of the former Soviet Union. His 1954 monograph Tarantula and Karakurt (Тарантул и Каракурт) is still used by zoologists, and his most popular general science books include For the Young Entomologist, In Talas Alatau and Across the Semirechye. He served in the Great Patriotic War (the Eastern Front of World War II), earning several honors including Order of the Red Star, Order of the Patriotic War, and Order of the Badge of Honour.
