= Webster University in Tashkent =

American university campus in Tashkent, Uzbekistan

- Toshkent shahridagi Vebster universiteti
- Building of University
- Type: Private, Non-profit
- Established: 2019
- Parent institution: Webster University
- Affiliations: Higher Learning Commission
- Rector: Anthony Jarvis
- Location: Tashkent, Uzbekistan
- Campus: Urban (13 Alisher Navoi Avenue)
- Colors: Yellow and Blue
- Nickname: Gorloks
- Mascot: Gorlok
- Website: www.webstertashkent.uz

Webster University in Tashkent (Uzbek: Toshkent shahridagi Vebster universiteti) is an international branch campus of Webster University (St. Louis, Missouri, United States) located in Tashkent, Uzbekistan. Established in 2019 by Presidential Decree PQ-4245, it is the first fully accredited American university campus in Central Asia.

All instruction at the Tashkent campus is conducted in English, and graduates earn American degrees issued directly by Webster University in the United States.

== History ==
In 2017, the Ministry of Higher and Secondary Special Education of Uzbekistan initiated discussions with Webster University to establish an American higher education institution in Tashkent as part of nationwide educational reforms.

On 20 March 2019, President Shavkat Mirziyoyev signed Presidential Decree PQ-4245, officially establishing the Center for the Implementation of Educational Programs of Webster University in Tashkent. The campus officially opened its doors in September 2019, offering undergraduate and graduate degree programs.

== Campus ==
The university is situated in central Tashkent at 13 Alisher Navoi Avenue, near the Alisher Navoiy metro station. The campus facility includes:

- Modern multimedia classrooms and lecture halls.
- The Information Resource Center (library and digital database access).
- A dedicated sports complex and indoor recreation area.
- A Center for Digital Education Technologies and student residence quarters.

== Academics ==
Webster University in Tashkent operates under the accreditation of the Higher Learning Commission (HLC) in the United States.

=== Undergraduate Programs ===
The university offers Bachelor of Arts (BA) and Bachelor of Science (BS) degrees in fields such as:

- Business Administration (BS)
- Economics (BA)
- Media Communications (BA)
- International Relations (BA)
- Computer Science (BS)
- Teaching English as a Second Language (TESL) (BA)

=== Graduate Programs ===
The campus offers master's degree programs tailored for working professionals:

- Master of Business Administration (MBA)
- Master of Arts in Teaching English to Speakers of Other Languages (MA TESOL)
- Master of Science in Cybersecurity Operations

== Student life and athletics ==
Students at Webster Tashkent participate in various extra-curricular activities, academic competitions, and sports leagues. The university mascot is the Gorlok, a mythical creature created by Webster University students in St. Louis.

Campus sports teams participate in the regional Students League in basketball, chess, and esports (competing in Counter-Strike 2 and Dota 2). The campus also hosts student societies, model UN conferences, and startup pitch competitions.

== Governance ==
The university operates under a joint partnership between Webster University (St. Louis) and the Ministry of Higher Education, Science and Innovations of Uzbekistan. The campus rector is Dr. Jean Paul van Marissing, who previously served as rector at Webster University campuses in Leiden and Tbilisi.
