= Tashkent State University of Economics =

Major university in Uzbekistan

Coordinates: 41°18′31″N 69°14′55″E

- Toshkent Davlat Iqtisodiyot Universiteti; Ташкентский государственный экономический университет
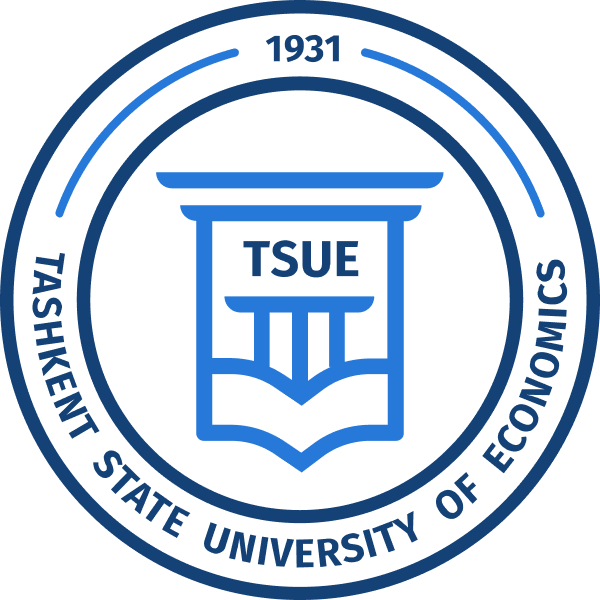
- Type: Public
- Established: 1931
- Affiliations: Tashkent state university of economics
- Rector: To'lqin Teshaboyev
- Academic staff: 1,446
- Undergraduates: 21,870
- Postgraduates: 1,151
- Location: Tashkent, Uzbekistan
- Campus: Urban
- Website: https://tsue.uz/en
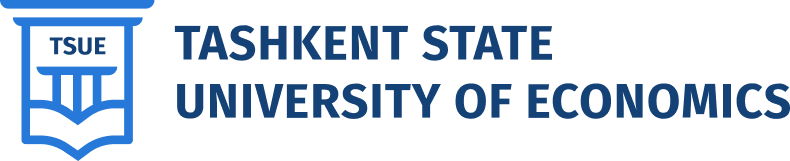

Tashkent State University of Economics (Uzbek: Тошкент Давлат Иқтисодиёт Университети, romanized: Toshkent Davlat Iqtisodiyot Universiteti; abbreviated TSUE), historically known as the Tashkent Institute of National Economy, is a public university in Tashkent, Uzbekistan, and one of the largest business schools in Central Asia.

TSUE was the first American-style business school in Uzbekistan. It maintains partnership agreements with universities in the United States, the United Kingdom, Germany, and other countries, and houses the largest university library in Central Asia. As of 2025, the university enrolled more than 23,000 students, including over 1,100 international students, and employed around 1,450 academic staff, among them members of the Academy of Sciences of Uzbekistan, the Academy of Humanities of the Russian Federation, the Academy of Natural Sciences of the Republic of Kazakhstan, and the International Academy of Work and Employment.

Tashkent State University of Economics is regarded as one of the leading higher education institutions in Uzbekistan, known for its academic programmes and research activity. The university offers undergraduate and postgraduate degrees in economics, finance, management, information technology, and related social science fields.

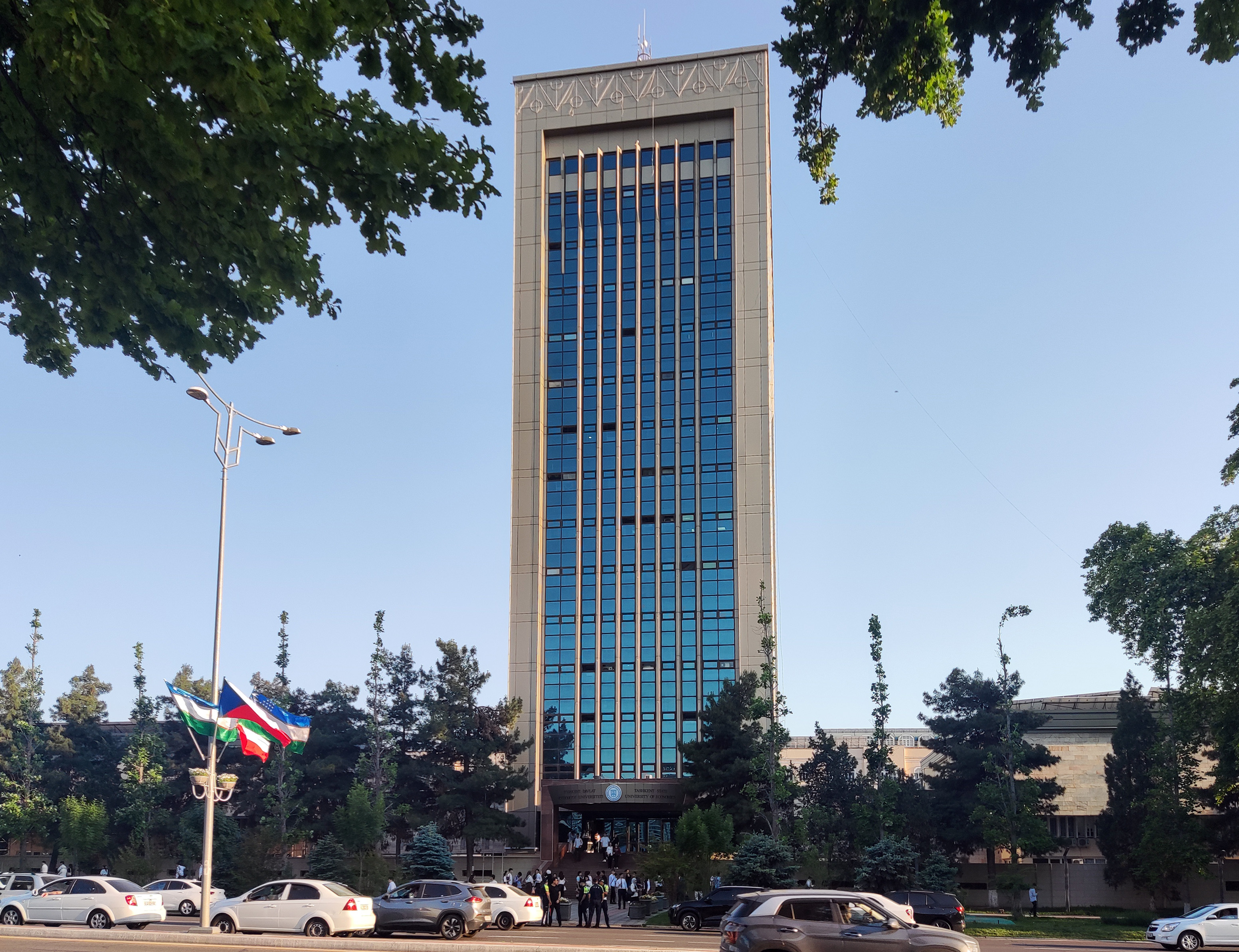
Tashkent State University of Economics

== History ==
At the beginning of the twentieth century there were only 3 commercial institutions that were intended to produce specialists in the field of commerce – in Tashkent city, Kokand city and Samarkand city. Moreover, there arose the need for the systematic solution of the problem related to the lack of economic degree holders, which gained a significant importance.

- 1918 – The organization of short-term courses of vocational preparation in the field of commerce under Turkestan People's University.
- 1924 – The organization of Social-Economic Faculty at Turkestan University on the basis of short-term courses of vocational preparation in the field of commerce.
- 1925 – The Conversion of Social-Economic Faculty of Turkestan University into the faculty of Social Sciences, which became a base for the establishment of the faculty of Local Economy and Law.
- 1931 – The Adoption of the Resolution on the creation of a systematic institute in Tashkent, which was subsequently joined with Central Asian Institute of State Trade and Cooperation and renamed into Uzbek Institute of National Economy.
- 1931 – The creation of Central Asian Financial and Economic Institute on 13 August, which was renamed into Tashkent Financial and Economic Institute on 31 August. This date is celebrated as Establishment Day of Tashkent State University of Economics every year.
- 1946 – The incorporation of Leningrad Institute of Finance and Economics into Tashkent Financial and Economic Institute, which was evacuated to Alma-ata city during World War II. The establishment of two faculties – the faculty of Credit and Economy and the faculty of Accounting and Economics.
- 1947 – The establishment of the faculty of economic planning, which started to produce specialists for industrial and agricultural sectors of Central Asian republics and Kazakhstan.
- 1948 – the establishment of the evening faculty, which commenced to produce on-job economists.
- 1955 – the establishment of extramural faculty, which was later divided into specialties of General Economy, and Accounting and Finance.
- 1962 – the renaming of Tashkent Financial and Economic Institute into Tashkent Institute of National Economy.
- 1967 – the organization of training courses, and in 1970 – training department.
- 1968 – the organization of Economic Cybernetics faculty. The education curriculum was enhanced due to increasing the share of mathematical disciplines.
- 1970 – the establishment of the faculty of Trade and Economy. The education curriculum and programs of business specialties were expanded and enhanced by means of adding applied business disciplines. The range of specialists released by the university in business and economic fields significantly rose.
- 1973 – the establishment of a university branch under Tashkent textile combine on the basis of extramural faculty, and later the establishment of Samarkand, Karshi educational and consulting centers, Andijan, Kokand branches, new branches of extramural faculty of General Economics.
- 1981 – the establishment of the faculty of Labour and Supply, which separated from the faculty of Trade and Economy.
- 1991 – the transformation of Tashkent Institute of National Economy into Tashkent State University of Economics by the Decree of the President of the Republic of Uzbekistan as of 6 June 1991.

During the development of independent Uzbekistan, the university witnessed the establishment of new faculties and divisions:

- 1990 – the Faculty of International Relations
- 1992 – the Institute of Economics, Business, and Professional Development and Retraining of Personnel
- 1995 – the faculty of International Business
- 1996 – Master's degree department
- 1999 – the Faculty of International Tourism
- 2018 – Joint educational program between TSUE and USUE
- 2019 – Joint educational program between TSUE and IMC Krems
- 2021 – Double degree educational program between TSUE and the University of London, and the London School of Economics and Political Science

== Rankings ==
In global and regional rankings published in 2025–2026, Tashkent State University of Economics was placed as follows:

Ranking body	Ranking	Position/Band	Year
QS World University Rankings	Overall (World)	1001–1200	2026
QS World University Rankings	Overall (World)	1201–1400	2027
THE Interdisciplinary Science Rankings	Interdisciplinary Science	201–250	2026
THE Impact Rankings	Overall	101–200	2026
SCImago Institutions Ranking	World	8,929th (1st in Uzbekistan)	2026
uniRank	World	5,154th (1st in Uzbekistan)	2026
Eduniversal	Business School Ranking (Regional)	2 Palmes of Excellence, 1st in Uzbekistan	2026

TSUE was among seven Uzbekistani universities to appear in the QS World University Rankings 2026, entering the 1001–1200 band alongside Samarkand State University, while five other Uzbek universities entered the ranking for the first time that year. The university also holds a five-star overall QS Stars rating (2025).

== Former rectors ==
- Khalikov I.U. 1931—1934
- Seyduzov S.S. 1934—1938
- Сирихов К. А. 1938—1940
- Popov M.G. 1940—1943
- Vlasenko 1943—1945
- Karakozov E.A. 1945—1947
- Tursunov M.T. 1947—1952
- Koriev M.M. 1952—1974
- Iskandarov I.I. 1974—1976
- Sharifkhojayev M.Sh.1976—1986
- Zoidov M.A. 1986—1988
- Gulyamov S.S. 1988—1998
- Alimov R.Kh. 1998—2004
- Gulyamov S.S. 2004—2006
- Khodiyev B.Y. 2006—2010
- Jumayev N.Kh. 2010—2012
- Vohobov A. 2012—2014
- Usmanov B.B. 2014—2015
- Boltaboev M. 2015—2016
- Khodiyev B.Y. 2016—2019
- Sharipov K. 2019—2023
- Teshaboyev T.Z. 2023—present

== Notable alumni ==
- Aziz Abduhakimov, Uzbek Deputy Prime Minister of the Republic of Uzbekistan
- Bakhtiyor Fazilov, Uzbek businessman
- Islam Karimov, Former President of the Republic of Uzbekistan
- Pavel Voshchanov, former Kremlin Press Secretary

== Faculties ==
The university has 5 faculties and the Master's Department:

- Faculty of Economics
- Faculty of Corporate Governance
- Faculty of Accounting and Audit
- Faculty of Information Systems in Economy
- Faculty of International Tourism

== Degrees and Specializations ==
The university offers a bachelor's degree in the following specializations:

- Finance and financial technologies
- Banking
- Corporate Governance
- Economics (by sectors and industries)
- Vocational training: economics
- Vocational training: information and IT
- Information and IT (by industries)
- Labour economics and sociology
- Human Resources Management
- Accounting and Audit
- Taxes and Taxation
- Statistics (by sectors and industries)
- Management (by sectors and industries)
- Marketing (by sectors and industries)
- Services (by types and industries)
- Hospitality Management
- World Economy and international economic relations (by regions and areas of activity)

The university offers a master's degree in the following specializations:

- Theory of Economics
- Economics (by sectors and industries)
- Macroeconomics
- Econometrics
- Information Technologies and Systems in Economy
- Antimonopoly Control and Competition Protection
- Management (by sectors and industries)
- Marketing (by sectors and industries)
- Logistics
- Public Finance Management
- Banking (by areas of activity)
- Taxes and Taxation
- Statistics (by sectors and industries)
- Tourism (by areas of activity)
- Accounting (by industries)
- Theory and Methodology of Vocational Training
- Demographics. Labour Economics
- Audit (by sectors and industries)
- Human Resources Management
- Investment Management (by sectors and industries)
- World Economy (by regions and areas of activity)
- International Economic Relations (by regions and areas of activity)

== See also ==
- Inha University in Tashkent
- Moscow State University in Tashkent named M.V Lomonosov
- Tashkent Automobile and Road Construction Institute
- Tashkent Financial Institute
- Tashkent Institute of Irrigation and Melioration
- Tashkent State Agrarian University
- Tashkent State Technical University
- Tashkent State University of Law
- Tashkent University of Information Technologies
- TEAM University Tashkent
- Turin Polytechnic University in Tashkent
- University of World Economy and Diplomacy
- Westminster International University in Tashkent
