= Tashkent State Technical University =

Oldest universities of Uzbekistan

- Toshkent Davlat Texnika Universiteti
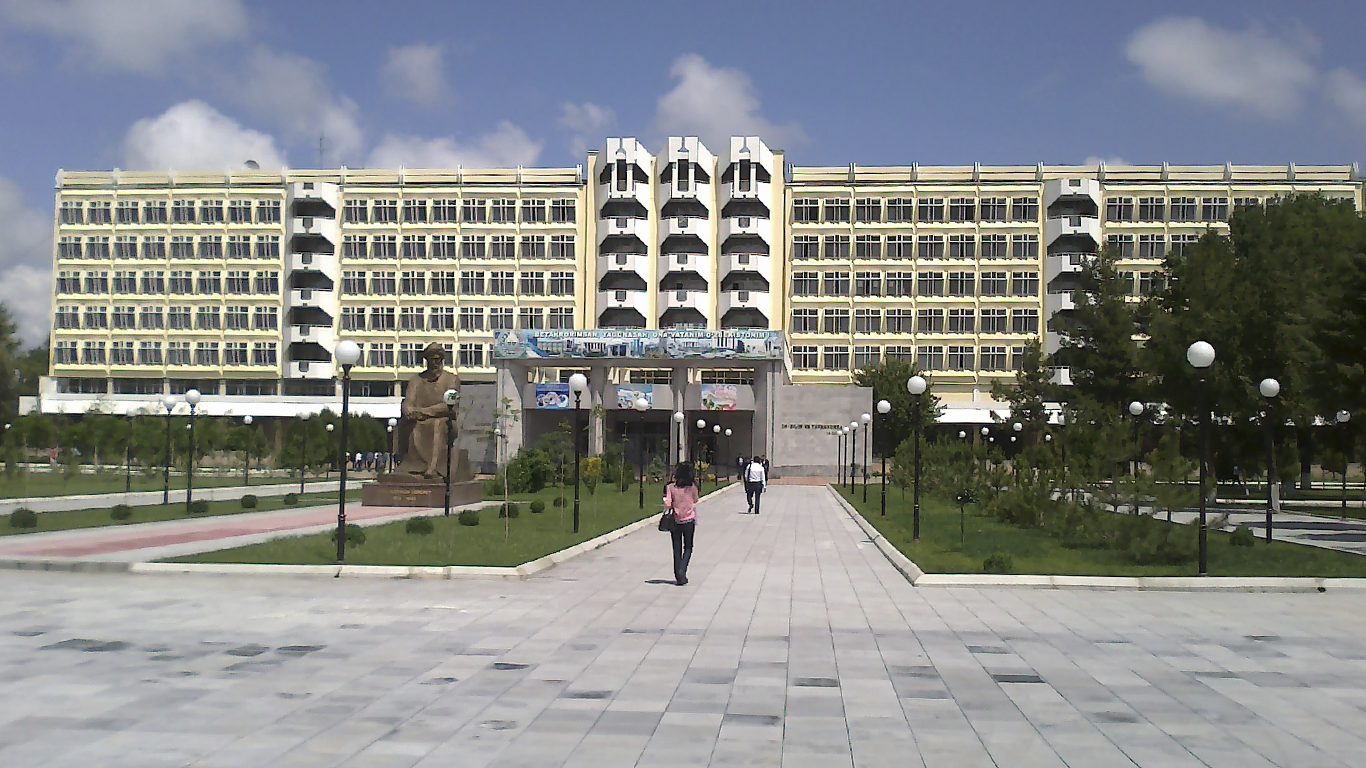
- Type: Public
- Established: 1918
- Rector: Turabjanov Sadriddin
- Location: (Uzbekistan) Tashkent, Uzbekistan
- Language: Uzbek, Russian
- Website: tdtu.uz

University rankings

Regional – Overall
- QS Emerging Europe and Central Asia: 351-400 (2022)

Tashkent State Technical University (TSTU) (Uzbek: Тошкент Давлат Техника Университети, romanized: Toshkent Davlat Texnika Universiteti) is one of the oldest universities in Uzbekistan. Currently, the university consists of 6 faculties, and prepares highly skilled professionals in technical and engineering fields. For this year, it is estimated to run 56 departments with over 10 746 students, who are taught by 6 academicians of the Academy of Sciences of Uzbekistan, 74 doctors of sciences and 314 candidates of sciences.

== History ==
The history of "Tashkent State Technical University," named after Abu Rayhan Beruni ("TSTU"), goes back to Soviet Union times. TSTU is currently one of the oldest educational institutions in Uzbekistan. Its first establishment date refers to April 21, 1918. Firstly, the university was established as the small technical faculty of "Turkistan National University", and it worked for the whole Central Asia. That technical faculty saw many changes in its history, but it is the base of current "Tashkent State Technical University". In 1923 it was re-set as the new faculty called "Engineering-melioration faculty". After 6 years, in 1929 in base of this faculty, there was created new institute called "Central Asian cotton-irrigation institute". After 4 years, in 1933 this institute became the fundament for new and unique technical university in Central Asia. From the year of 1949 it was renamed to "Central Asian Poly Technical Institute". From the year 1961 it was called as the "Tashkent Poly Technical institute". In 1973 it was named after one of the greatest scientists of Uzbekistan Abu Rayhan Beruni, and was called as the "Tashkent Poly Technical Institute named Abu Rayhan Beruni". After the Independence of Uzbekistan, by the edict President of Republic Uzbekistan Islam Karimov, university was renamed to "Tashkent State Technical University named after Abu Rayhan Beruni" and it became one of the leading educational centers of Uzbekistan. Based on the decree of the President of Uzbekistan Shavkat Mirziyoyev dated January 25, 2017, on June 23, 2017, the Tashkent State Technical University was named after Islam Karimov. University has passed about 100 years of history to get its current name "Tashkent State Technical University named after Islam Karimov" and to reach its current prestige. President of Republic Uzbekistan Islam Karimov has also graduated from this university. During its long history the "Tashkent State Technical University" has become the base for 16 other universities and colleges in Uzbekistan, which are "Fergana Poly Technical Institute" (1967), "Tashkent Institute of Automobile and Highways" (1972), "Samarkand architectural institute" (1980), "Bukhara Technological Institute of Food and Light Industry" (1977), "Namangan Engineering-Economic Institute" (1973), "Navoi State Mining Institute" (1995), "Andijan Institute of Engineering Economics and Management (1995), "Tashkent Engineering Institute" (1989), "Tashkent Institute of Chemical Technology" (1991), "Tashkent Architecture and Construction Institute" (1991), "Karshi Engineering-economic Institute" (1995), "Tashkent State Institute of Aviation" (1995), "Nukus Industrial-Pedagogical Institute" (1995), "Angren Technical College" (1995), "Almalyk Technical College" (1995), "Chirchik Technology College" (1995).

== General Information ==
There are 8 faculties, 58 departments, 735 professors-teachers and more than 11 thousand students at Tashkent State Technical University. Tashkent State Technical Institute nowadays trains specialists and professionals following the educational programs which are listed below:

- Bachelor's degree, duration 4 years
- Master's degree, duration 2 years
- Doctoral degree, duration 3 years

Moreover, the university has 5 specialized councils, in which people defend their doctoral dissertations in 12 fields. Recently, the University has held over 200 projects which are founded by the Republic Uzbekistan. In addition, there 6 scientific magazines published every week in the Tashkent State Technical University and they are: "Technical science and innovation", "", "Ta'lim tizimida ijtimoiy-gumanitar fanlar", "Energiya va resurs tejash muammolari", "Chemical Technology, Control and Management", "", "Kompozitsion materiallar", "Texnika Yulduzlari"

== Missions ==
Just as other universities, "Tashkent State Technical University" has set its own missions in development of technical field in Uzbekistan. They are stated in the official document and constitution of the university. Mission of the university can also be looked as the strategy of development of this university, and it is approved by the rectors of the university and the government representatives of Uzbekistan. There are 4 main missions and plans for development in Tashkent State Technical University, and they are given as follows:

1. Satisfy the needs of society in the qualified professionals on technical field;
2. Developing and upbringing of well educated person, with required professional competences;
3. Developing scientific institutions with high world standards;
4. Training qualified, competent and democratically thinking specialists.

== Recognizable graduates ==
Tashkent State Technical University is popular in Uzbekistan because it has trained dozens of academicians, state prize laureates, hundreds of inventors, professors and doctors. There are a number of graduates from Tashkent State Technical University who have contributed their knowledge in development of Uzbekistan, and became academicians of technical sciences. The following list of 19 academicians of technical sciences who graduated from Tashkent State Technical University:

1. Abdullayev Xabib Muxamedovich (1912–1962)
2. Urazboev Muxammad Toshevich (1906–1971)
3. Homidxonov Muzaffar Zohidxonovich (1916–1972)
4. Orifov Ubay Orifovich (1905–1976)
5. Axmedov Karim Sodiqovich (1914–1996)
6. Fozilov Hosil Fozilovich (1909–2003)
7. Qobulov Hosil Qobulovich (1921 – )
8. Akramxodjayev Abid Muratovich (1920–1996)
9. Xamrobayev Ibragim Xamrabayevich (1920–2002)
10. Nabiyev Malik Nabievich
11. Mavlonov G'ani Orifxonovich (1910–1988)
12. Boymuhamedov Hosil Nurmatovich (1918–1990)
13. Uklonskiy Aleksandr Sergeyevich (1888–1972)
14. Salimov Oqil Umrzoqovich (1928)
15. Mirkomilov Tulgin Mirolilovich (1939–2004)
16. Salimov Zokirjon (1940)
17. Rahimov Gofir Rahimovich (1905–1972)
18. Rahimov Vahob Raximovich (1934–2014)
19. Yusupbekov Nodirbek Rustambekovich (1940)

== Contacts with International Universities ==
Tashkent State Technical University holds meetings with different universities and educational centers all around the globe each year. The reason for this meetings is signing contracts with international universities, in order to inherit knowledge from those universities and exchange students because of the practice purpose. There were more than 10 delegations from international universities so far, and they are listed below.

=== Delegation from USA ===
In 2016 on the dates of 11th, 12th, and January 13 there was meeting in Tashkent State Technical University. The main reason of the meeting was enlarging practical skills of the students. Guest lecturer was from "Wisconsin-Madison University (US), professor Sundaram Gunesekaran. Topic of the speech was about metrology.

=== Older meetings ===
On June 11 the year of 2015, meeting was held with French delegation.

On May 18, 2015 there was meeting with the delegation of Russian Technical University.

On April 16, 2015 there was the meeting with delegation from "Scientific-research University of Information Technologies".

On April 14, 2015 there was the visit of rector of "Moscow State Technical University".

On April 13, 2015 vice-rector of "Poland Technical University" visited the "Tashkent State Technical University" on universal issues.

On April 7, 2015, Tashkent State Technical University received Council of Latvia, and signed a contract with "Riga Technical University".

On March 28, 2015, president of "Xolon Technical University" visited the "Tashkent State Technical University".

== Rectors ==
Currently, the rector of "Tashkent State Technical University" is Saydaxmedov Ravshan Xalxodjayevich. In the history of "Tashkent State Technical University" there were 17 rectors including Mr.Saydaxmedov Ravshan Xalxodjayevich. And they are listed below:

- Kolbasnikov I.V (1934–1939)
- Suxanov A.R (1939–1940)
- Abdullayev H.M (1940–1941)
- Shmidt M.A (1941–1943)
- Tuxtaxujaev S.T (1943–1947)
- Niyozov M.I (1947–1963)
- Urazboev M.I (1963–1971)
- Xomitxonov M.Z (1971–1972)
- Axmedov K. S (1972–1988)
- Jalilov A.T (1988–1991)
- Yusupbekov N.R (1991–1992)
- Salimov O.U (1992–1994)
- Mirkomilov T.M (1994–2001)
- Allaev Q.R (2001–2005)
- Shoobidov Sh.A (2005–2011)
- Adilxodjaev A.I (2011–2013)
- Saydaxmedov R.X (2013 – )

== Faculties ==
There are eight faculties in the university: the Faculty of Thermal Power Engineering; the Faculty of Electronics and Automation; the Faculty of Energy; the Faculty of Geology and Mining; the Faculty of Mechanical Engineering; the Faculty of Mechanics; the Faculty of Oil and Gas; and the Faculty of Engineering Technology.

=== Faculty of Electronics and Automation ===
The Faculty of Electronics and Automation is one of the oldest faculties of Tashkent State Technical University., The current dean of the faculty is Zikrillayev Xayrulla Fatxullayevich. There are nine departments within the faculty:

- Metrology
- Automating and controlling of creation process
- Electronics and microelectronics
- Radio-electric constructions
- Information technologies in controlling
- Tools
- Theoretical electro-technologies
- Information technologies
- Physics

There are nine bachelor's degree branches and thirteen master's degree branches in the faculty.

=== Faculty of Energy ===
The Faculty of Energy trains specialists in the energetics field. Currently, the dean of the faculty is Toshov Javoxir Bo'rievich. There are eight departments in the faculty:

- Hydraulics and hydraulics energy
- Energy of heat
- Calculus
- Branches and systems of electric stations
- Electric supplement
- Electro technics and energy
- Electro technics, electro mechanics and electro technologies
- Electro mechanics and fiber techniques

There are five branches for bachelor's degree, and thirteen branches for master's degree at "Faculty of energy".

=== Faculty of Geology and Mining ===
The Faculty of geology has nine departments, which are:

- Mining work
- Geology and seeking of valuable mined materials
- Geology, mineralogy
- Hydrogeology and geophysics
- Electro-mechanics of mining
- Geodesics
- Metallurgy
- Physical education and sport
- Foreign languages

=== Faculty of Mechanical Engineering ===
The Faculty of Mechanical Engineering's dean is Berdiyev Dorob Murodovich. There are ten departments in this faculty:

- Mechanical technologies
- Technical machine and tools
- Materializing and material technology
- Transport systems
- Technique and service of agricultural industry
- Utilization of mechanical materials
- Energy mechanical machines
- Machine parts
- Mechanics
- Geometry and graphing

=== Faculty of Engineering Technology ===
Currently the dean of the faculty is Makhmudov Nazirila Nasimkhanovich. The faculty has departments:

- Biomedical engineering
- Ecology and environment protection
- Corporate governance
- Biotechnology
- Chemistry
- Oil and gas mines' geology
- Industrial Design

== Location ==
Tashkent State Technical University named after Islam Karimov is located in Uzbekistan, Tashkent city, Olmazor district, University street 2, 100095.

== See also ==
- TEAM University Tashkent
- Turin Polytechnic University in Tashkent
- Inha University in Tashkent
- Tashkent Institute of Irrigation and Melioration
- Tashkent Financial Institute
- Moscow State University in Tashkent named M.V Lomonosov
- Tashkent Automobile and Road Construction Institute
- Tashkent State University of Economics
- Tashkent State Agrarian University
- Tashkent State University of Law
- Tashkent University of Information Technologies
- University of World Economy and Diplomacy
- Westminster International University in Tashkent
