= Grigory Bey-Bienko =

Russian entomologist (1903–1971)

Grigory Yakovlevich Bey-Bienko (Russian: Григорий Яковлевич Бей-Биенко; 7 February 1903 – 3 November 1971) was a Soviet and Russian entomologist who specialized in Orthoptera.

== Life and education ==
Bey-Bienko was born in Bilopillia. During his childhood, he regularly accompanied his father on trips in Siberia, and it was during these that he developed his interest in insects. He graduated from the Omsk Institute of Agriculture, having made a list of local acridoidea while still a student.

During the Second World War, he took part in the Siege of Leningrad, before being evacuated to Perm.

== Career ==
Bey-Bienko moved to Leningrad in 1927, and there worked in the USSR Institute for Plants Protection (Vsesoyuznij Institut Zaschity Rastenij, 1929–1938), Leningrad Agricultural Institute (1938–1968) and Institute for Zoology of the Academy of Sciences of the Soviet Union (starting in 1948). During this time, he produced many works on the ecology and entomology of groups as diverse as the Tettigoniidae and Dermaptera native to the USSR.

He was a Stalin Prize winner (1952), corresponding member of the Academy of Sciences of the Soviet Union (starting in 1953) and chairman of the USSR Entomology Society (starting in 1966).

He was one of the editors of Keys to the Insects of the European Part of the USSR (Leningrad, Nauka; published in English by Amerind Publishing, New Delhi) and Fauna of the European Part of the USSR (Leningrad, Nauka; published in English by Amerind Publishing, New Delhi).

== Selected works ==
- Bey-Bienko G. Ya., 1954: Insecta: Orthoptera: Tettigoniidae: Phaneropterinae. Fauna SSSR. 388 pp.
- Bey-Bienko G. Ya., 1962 Об общей классификации насекомых (On the general classification of insects). Энтомологическое обозрение (Entomol. Rev. URSS) 49 (1): 6–21
- Data related to Grigory Yakovlevich Bey-Bienko at Wikispecies
