= Gulistan State University =

University in Guliston, Uzbekistan

Coordinates: 40°30′22″N 68°47′00″E

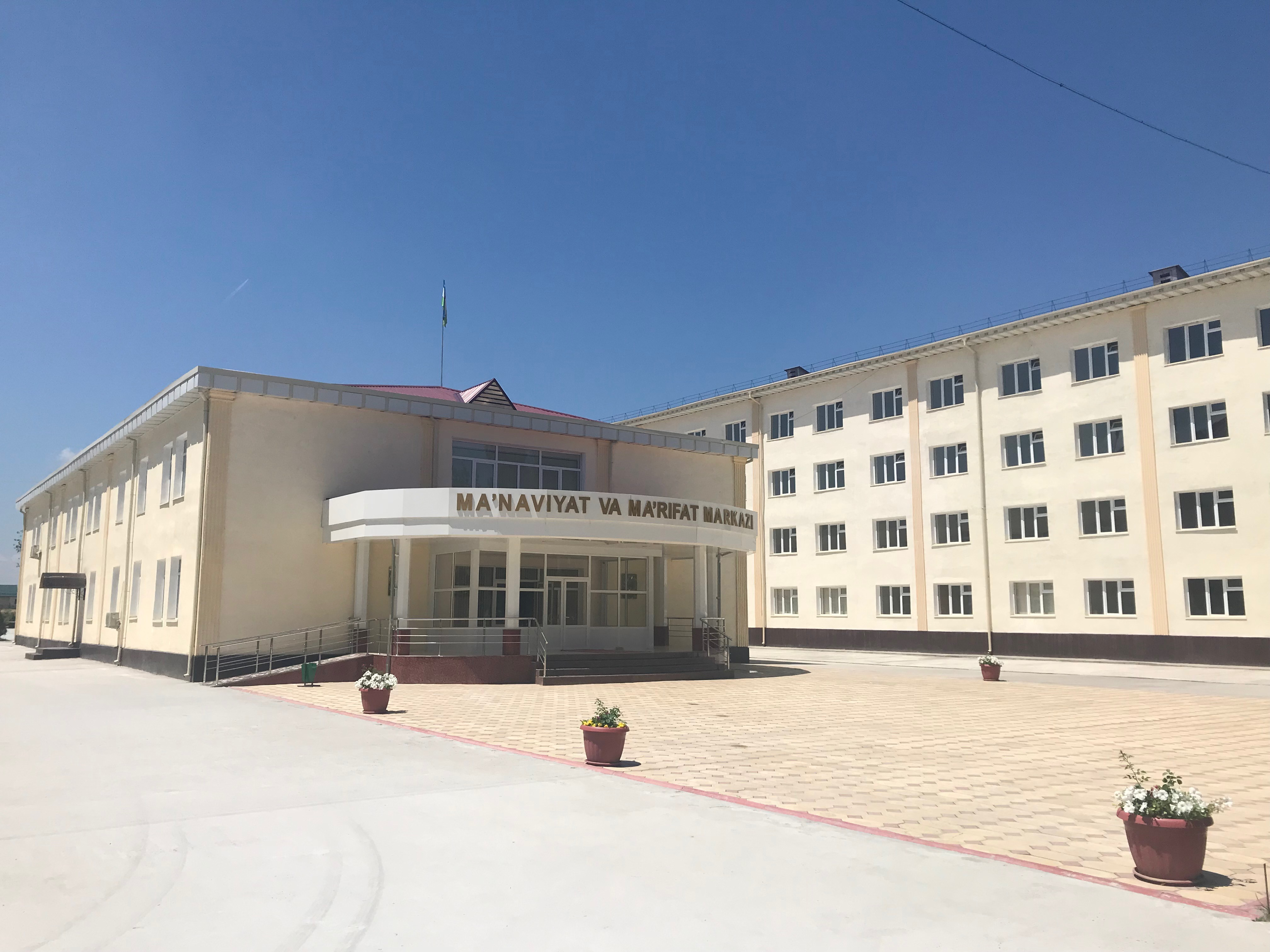
- Gulistan State University campus in 2019
- Established: 1965
- Rector: Mukhsin Khodzhaev
- Students: 16,942
- Location: Guliston, Uzbekistan
- Website: guldu.uz

Gulistan State University (GSU) is a public university in Guliston, Uzbekistan.

== History ==
The school was established in 1965 as part of the Syrdarya State Pedagogical Institute. It was established to provide education in Uzbek, Kazakh, Russian, and Tajik, which were spoken in the multilingual Guliston region. In 1966, the school was renamed to honor Gʻafur Gʻulom. The school became a university in 1992, after a resolution was passed to establish a university in Sirdaryo Region.

In the 21st century, the school is a research university that awards doctoral degrees, master's degrees, and bachelor's degrees. It is divided into six faculties: philology, physics and mathematics, pedagogy, natural sciences, social sciences and economics, and biology.

The university's Experimental Biology Laboratory was established in 2021 with funding from the World Bank's Academic Innovation Fund. In 2025, a joint Chinese-Uzbekistani food laboratory was established at Gulistan State University.
