= Tashkent State University of Law =

Public university in Tashkent, Uzbekistan

- Toshkent davlat yuridik universiteti
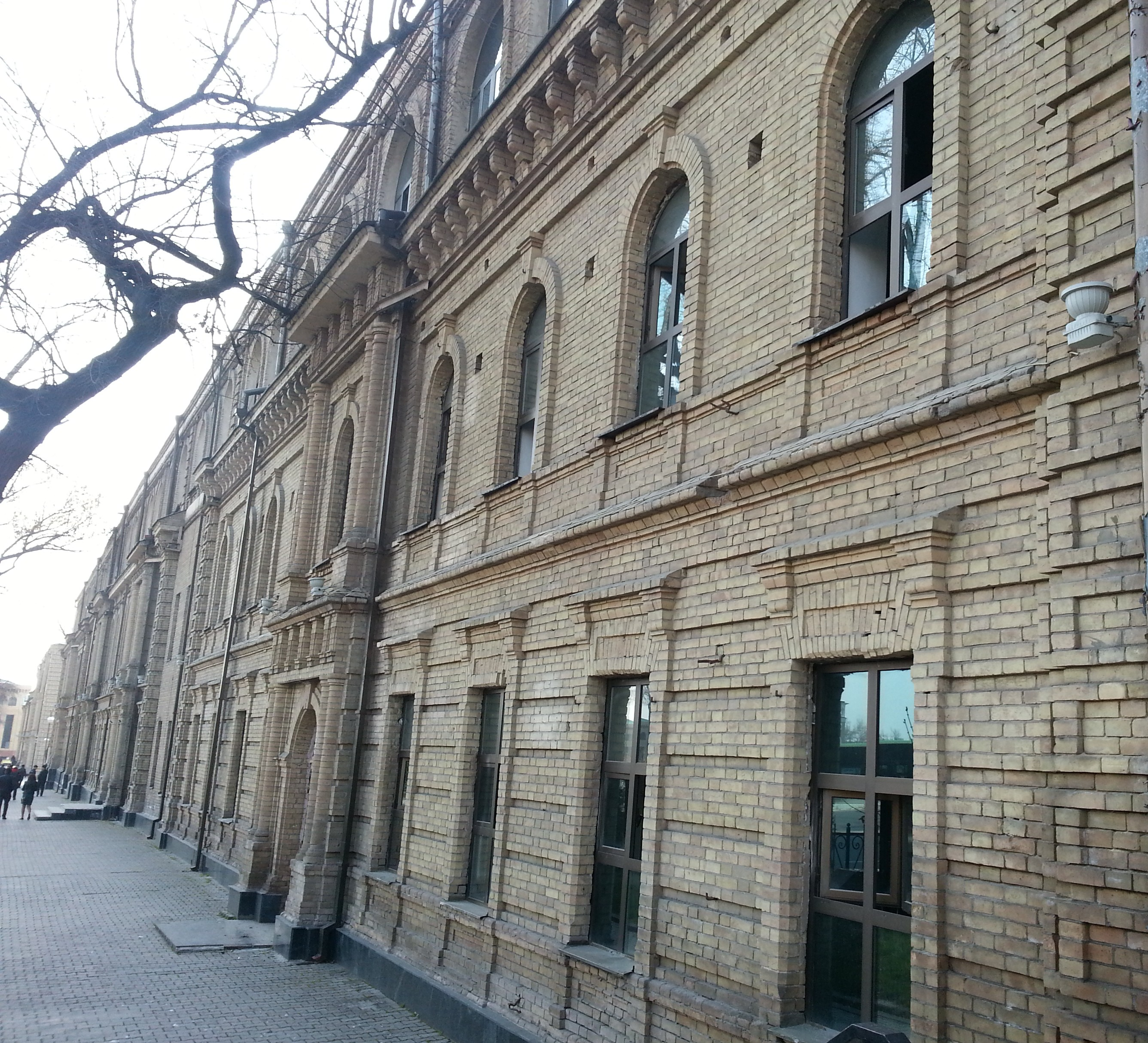
- Former names: Tashkent State Institute of Law (until 2013)
- Motto: Strength is in justice
- Type: Public
- Established: 1918
- Rector: Bakhshillo Khodzhaev
- Academic staff: 242
- Students: 7000
- Location: 35/2 Sayilgoh Street, Tashkent, Uzbekistan; 41°18′39″N 69°16′39″E
- Website: tsul.uz
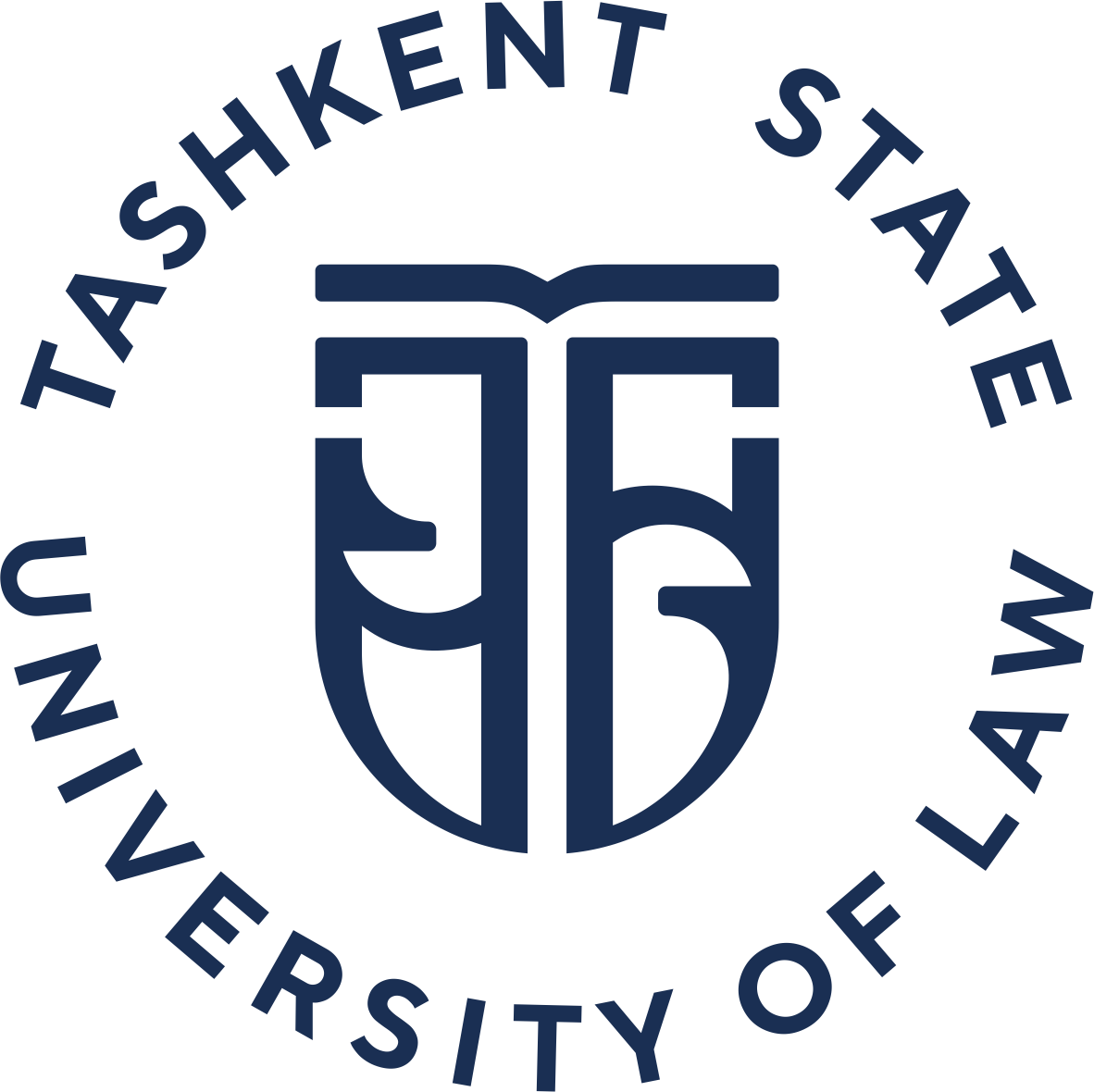

Tashkent State University of Law (TSUL) is a public higher educational institution. It is one of the leading Uzbek legal research centers, located in the capital city of Tashkent.

The university is one of the leading universities in Uzbekistan, renowned as a national center of legal science and education, its prestige is widespread locally, extends far beyond the borders of the Republic, as well.

In 2021, Tashkent State University of Law was ranked as one of the TOP-500 universities in the world by Times Higher Education.

The university comprises twelve specialized and three general-studies departments, a center of professional legal training and career development based on international standards, a specialized branch for training and retraining of legal personnel in the sphere of crime prevention, public security and Academic Lyceum. Moreover, the university also provides methodological guidance and coordination of 14 professional law colleges that are part of the system of educational institutions of the Ministry of Justice of The Republic of Uzbekistan.

The rector of the university is Bakhshillo Khodzhaev. TSUL is under the authority of the Ministry of Justice. Therefore, the rector of the university is the Deputy Minister of Justice of the Republic of Uzbekistan.

== History of the university ==
The history of the university dates back to April 21, 1918, when department of legal studies was established on the base of socio-economic faculty in Turkestan State University. This was the first step in establishment of law department in Central Asia, particularly, in Uzbekistan.

In the period from 1918 to 1990, department underwent a number of transformations from the Institute of Soviet law under the peoples Commissariat of Justice of the UzSSR to the faculty of law of Tashkent State University.

On August 15, 1991, Tashkent State Institute of Law was founded on the base of the faculty of law of the Tashkent State University. Since its establishment, the institution has become an integral part of legal education and science, embodying the concept of the classical trinity, that is, education, science and practice.

Throughout the years, a number of outstanding legal scientists graduated the institute, such as B. Manelis, M. Lutsky, S. Avrukh, K. Sarimsakov, H. Kurbonov, N. Kapustyansky, T. Eshonbekov, D. Arrenbek, academicians S. Rajabov and H. Suleymanova.

The history of the university is also closely connected with the development of the national law school in Uzbekistan and the names of such prominent scientists as academician Khodjiakbar Rakhmonkulov, Boris Blinder, Georgy Sarkisyants, academician Shavkat Urazaev, Shoakbar Shorakhmetov, Gafur Abdumajidov, Ikram Zakirov and many other lawyers who have made a great contribution to the development of Uzbek legal sciences.

In 2013, the Tashkent State Institute of Law was transformed into a university. At the same time, the transition to a qualitatively new modular training system has given legal education a completely new impulse.

The teaching staff of the university currently more than 250 employees, including more than 20 doctors of science, 60 doctors of philosophy, 20 professors, and 30 associate professors.

The university educates specialists in the field of law for all public authorities, as well as private structures. Today, the university has about 3,600 students, including 124 master's degree.

== Rectors ==
- 1991 – 1993 – Agzamkhodjaev Anvar Agzamovich
- 1993 – 1994 – Saidov Akmal Kholmatovich
- 1994 – 1995 – Urazaev Shavkat Zakarievich
- 1995 – 2001 – Boboev Khalimbai Boboevich
- 2001 – 2012 – Rustambayev Mirzayusuf Khakimovich
- 2012 – 2013 – Mukhamedjanov Amanulla Zakirovich
- 2013 – 2019 – Kanyazov Esemurat Sultamuratovich
- 2019 – 2021 – Hakimov Rahim Rasuljonovich
- 2021 – 2021 – Rustambekov Islambek Rustambekovich
- 2021 – 2022 – Tashkulov Akbar Jo`rabaevich
- 2022 - 2025 – Rustambekov Islambek Rustambekovich
- 2025 - till now – Bakhshillo Khodzhaev

== Admission ==
Admission to the university is based on the results of tests in the following disciplines:

- Foreign language
- Fundamentals of state and law
- For foreign citizens, admission is on the basis of an interview (studying only on the basis of tuition fee)

== Teaching at the university ==
The university is famous for its achievements in the sphere of legal training and is among the top universities in the country. Classes are conducted in three languages: Uzbek, Russian, and English. Knowledge of English, can be confirmed with an IELTS certificate or English language exam at the university. The university prepares legal personnel for the academic bachelor's degree in the sphere of law within the framework of five LL.B. programs:

- Constitutional law
- Civil law
- Criminal law
- International law
- Business law

Master's degree courses are conducted in eight LL.M. programs:

- Public law and governance
- Theory and practice of application of criminal law
- Law and business
- Law and information technologies
- Financial and legal monitoring
- Law and Medicine
- Law and construction
- Law and intellectual property

The university has a military department under the National University of Uzbekistan, after training at the military department students receive the rank of Lieutenant.

=== Educational and academic process ===
The university implements a two-stage system of education in accordance with modern standards:

- the first stage -preparation of bachelors, LL.B. (4 years in full-time department);
- the second stage - preparation of master graduates in the selected graduate programmes, LL.M. (1 year).

In the first year of the study, students of the educational program receive comprehensive basic theoretical knowledge in the field of state and law, starting from the second year of study - learners are taught in selected branches of law (according to the profile specialty), as well as some related disciplines like economics, political science, sociology, history. In addition, graduates receive the necessary practical skills for further work in the legislative and law enforcement spheres, public authorities and law firms. Main modules: Constitutional law, Administrative law, Civil law, Criminal law, Labor law, Environmental law, Civil procedural law, Criminal procedural law, Financial law, Criminology, Tax law, International law, Commercial law, Land law, Personal development, Methodology of Legal researches, Legal writing, and soon.

The educational process is provided by a solid teaching staff, such as doctor of law, academician A.Saidov, honored scientist of the Republic of Uzbekistan, doctor of law, Professor, H. Babayev and others.

Academician H.Rakhmankulov, well-known professors B.Blinder, A.Zakutsky, Y.Karaketov, Ya.Pesin, G.Sarkisyan, Sh.Shorakhmetov, I.Zakirov, one of the first women in the Ministers of Justice, Mrs. H.Suleymanova, and many others had conducted lessons at the university.

In the academic process, students provide a special type of compulsory practice, that is, free legal assistance to the population in person, working in the Legal clinic of TSUL under the guidance of their teachers. The clinic offers full-time service, in addition, "Legal clinic. Online reception" section is available on the web page.

=== Departments of TSUL ===
The university has specialized and general educational departments.

Specialized departments:

- Public law and governance
- Civil law
- Civil procedural and economic procedural law
- Business law
- Labour law
- Theory and history of state and law
- Ecological and Land law
- Criminal law
- Criminal procedure and criminalistics
- Private International law
- International law and human rights
- Intellectual property law

General education departments:

- General sciences
- Language training
- Physical education and sport

=== The Information Resource Center ===
The library is a special structure of the higher educational institution, which covers all areas of activity: educational, scientific and spiritual-enlightenment, actively participates in ensuring the development of the educational, scientific and cultural process of the university.

The formation and development of the Information Resource Center of the Tashkent State University of Law (IRC TSUL) is inextricably linked with the formation and development of legal education in Uzbekistan.

Today, the library is the most important part in the academic system of scientific legal researches, which has a rich collection of literature, numbering about three hundred thousand copies of native and foreign literature and periodicals.

The IRC has a rich and unique collection of about 3,000 copies of the book, this is the work of Professor Ivan Neumann, "The initial foundations of criminal law" of 1814, the Commentary of Muslim Law of 1893, "Al Khidoya fi Sharh Bidoya al Mubtadi" or abbreviated: "Kitab al Hidoya" by the famous thinker, scientist, philosopher, theologian, Islamic lawyer-fiqih, who received the title Sheikh-ul-Islam Burhanuddin Abul-Hasan Ali Ibn Abu Bakr al-Marghinani ar-Roshidoniy, better known as Burhanuddin al-Marghinani (Burkhoniddin al-Margiloniy; September 23, 1123, Rishton - October 29, 1197, Samarkand) and more than 100 volumes of the Codes of the Russian Empire. Since 2019, the Information Resource Center has been a member of the International Association of University Libraries in Düsseldorf, Germany.

== Scientific activity ==
There are 23 Doctors of science (DSc) and 69 Doctors of philosophy (PhD) at the university. Among them, there are 20 professors, 35 associate professors. The academic potential of the university is 37%. The average age of candidates of science is 46 years, and the average age of those with doctors of philosophy (PhD) is 34 years, and the average age of doctors of science (DSc) is 50.

The university has a total of 17 doctoral students and more than 300 independent researchers. More than 10 of them are foreign citizens.

In 2019, the Ministry of Higher and Secondary Specialized Education of the Republic of Uzbekistan in cooperation with the Dutch "Elsevier", "Science - 2020" within the framework of the program "Research Transformation: Global Outlook" organized International scientific forum at the university.

The university has post-graduate training institutes in the form of doctoral studies and independent research. Two of the scientific Councils of DSc.07/30.12.2019.22.01 and DSc.07/30.12.2019.Yu.22.02 carry out activities on awarding academic degrees in the following specialties:

- 12.00.01 - Theory and history of state and law. History of legal doctrines
- 12.00.02 - Constitutional law. Administrative law. Financial and customs law
- 12.00.03 - Civil law. Business law. Family law. Private international law
- 12.00.04 - Civil procedural law. Economic procedural law. Arbitration and mediation
- 12.00.08 - Criminal law. The prevention of crime. Criminology. Criminal executive law

University publishes 3 periodical scientific journals including the list of scientific publications recommended by the Higher Attestation Commission under the Cabinet of Ministers of the Republic of Uzbekistan, as well as those included in the list of national databases, such as Digital Commons-Uzbekistan (www.uzjournals.edu.uz), Database of scientific periodicals (http://uzscite.uz), RSCI (Russian scientific citation index) and other international databases for publishing the main scientific results of research papers:

- legal scientific and practical journal of "Yuridik fanlar akhborotnomasi – Review of law sciences"
- Journal of "Review of legislation of Uzbekistan"
- e-journal of "TSUL Legal Report"

The Young Scientists Council has been established at the university to coordinate the academic activities of young teachers, doctoral students and independent researchers. More than 15 scientific training courses were organized under the Chairs of the university (Academic, Student Business Club, Civilization, Criminologist, Lawyer-Ecologists, Procedure, Labor Protection Adviser, etc.) more than 1000 gifted students are involved.

The university works closely with internationally recognized organizations such as QS (Quacquarelli Symonds World University Rankings), THE (Times Higher Education).

During the academic year 2019–2020, there are 7 research grants totaling 2.2 billion sums. In 2019, a total of 230 scientific articles were published and published in 44 international journals, 25 of them included in the International Scientific and Technical databases Scopus and Web of Science. Also, prepared 28 monographs. In 2019, the university received 14 certificates of copyright protection. In addition, the relevant ministries and organizations received evidence from 23 professors and teachers about their practical implementation.

The World Bank is implementing an Innovative Form of Enhancing Legal Education through the Electronic University Platform, funded by the Academic Innovation Fund (US$140,000). In addition, the European Union Erasmus + grant project ($200,000) is being implemented in cooperation with the University of Gdansk in Poland and the University of Lund in Sweden.

== International cooperation ==
International cooperation of TSUL is based on more than 30 agreements with foreign universities in Europe, Asia, USA, research centers and research institutes, as well as embassies, international scientific and educational founds. Among the partner universities, the universities of Osaka and Nagoya (Japan), Boston College (United States), the University of Law (UK), University of Gdańsk (Poland), German University of Administrative Sciences in Speyer and the German Research Institute for Public Law Administration, University of Regensburg (Germany), Shanghai University of Politics and Law (China), Ural State Law University (Russia), Polotsk State University (Republic of Belarus), Kazakh State University of Law named after Narikbaeva (Kazakhstan) and many other universities. On September 7, 2005, the center for the study of Japanese law and language was established. The purpose of the center is to provide students with the opportunity to study Japanese law in order to conduct a comparative legal analysis of Japanese legislation and develop proposals for improving Uzbek legislation taking into account national characteristics. In 2020, it is planned to create a Center of German Law and Comparative Law at the Tashkent State University of Law in cooperation with the Regensburg University (Germany). Within the framework of the signed memorandum, academic exchange of students and teachers is carried out, joint research and internships are conducted.

== Terms of admission ==
The university provides students with all the opportunities for study, as well as sports, creativity and self-development. Also, the university has its own modern Fitness Hall, Sports Hall, Coworking Zone, Information Resource Center, and more than 30 different clubs.

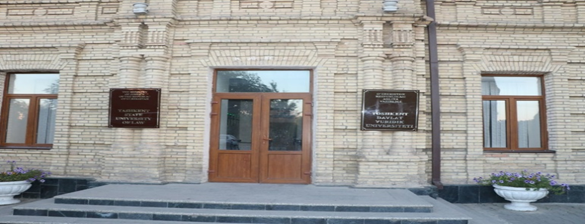
Tashkent State University of Law

The main building, with an area of 3504 thousand square meters, located at 35/2, Sayilgoh street. There are 5 departments in the building, 26 lecture and seminar classrooms, the administration, the University Council Hall, the administrative departments of the university, and the Legal Clinic.

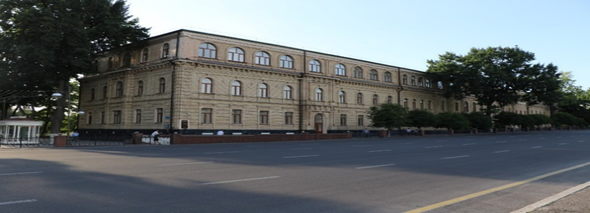
Tashkent State University of Law

The second building with an area of 6927 thousand square meters consists of 5 departments, 43 lecture and seminar classrooms, courtrooms for Moot court, and a forensic Laboratory. It is worth noting that these educational buildings are architectural monuments that were built in 1875.

The third educational building is on 13, A. Temur Street with an area of 9557 thousand square meters, is the former building of the Officers' House of District, which was transferred to the TSUL in 2013. After a major reconstruction, the building includes of 5 departments, 21 lecture and seminar rooms, 2 computer classes. A modern sports complex has been equipped in the building to organize leisure activities and conduct physical training classes for students. The information and resource center, which includes two conference rooms, a library with a book depository, a reading- room, etc., is also located in this building. The campus of TSUL consists of two 4-storey buildings with 488 beds with a total area of 8972 square meters. Students live in comfortable single and double rooms. Students' house provides with all the necessary comforts for students. In addition, the building has a kitchen, laundry, fitness room and library, as well as a Wi-Fi zone.

== Special structural units of the university ==
=== Specialized Branch of Law ===
In February 2019, a Specialized Branch of the Tashkent State University of Law was established to train and retrain legal personnel in the sphere of crime prevention and ensuring public safety in Tashkent and Tashkent region. This Branch prepares personnel for the system of the Ministry of Internal Affairs and the National Guard of the Republic of Uzbekistan.

Center for Professional Training of Legal Personnel in accordance with International Standards.

The center was established in 2017 in order to provide professional training of legal personnel in accordance with international standards that can adequately represent the interests of the Republic and organizations of the country in the international arena, and ensure wide access to legal education.

The center operates in three directions:

- organization of short-term courses for professional training of legal personnel in accordance with international standards
- 6-month retraining courses in the legal specialty for people with higher non-legal education
- modern retraining courses for teaching staff in the sphere of law

International legal training courses for legal personnel are conducted exclusively by lawyers and experts from leading international law firms such as White & Case, Foley Hoag, Dentons, Sidley Austin, Vinson & Elkins, Willkie Farr & Gallagher, Hogan Lovells and University of Glasgow based on concluded memorandum of cooperation. At the end of the courses, students who successfully complete the training are sent for internships to the offices of world-famous law firms and international arbitration institutes.

== See also ==
- TEAM University Tashkent
- Turin Polytechnic University in Tashkent
- Tashkent State Technical University
- Tashkent Institute of Irrigation and Agricultural Mechanization Engineers
- Tashkent Institute of Finance
- Moscow State University, Tashkent
- Tashkent Automobile and Road Construction Institute
- Tashkent State University of Economics
- Tashkent State Agrarian University
- Tashkent University of Information Technologies
- University of World Economy and Diplomacy
- Universities in the United Kingdom
- Education in England
- Education in Uzbekistan
- Tashkent
