= Tashkent State Agrarian University =

Agricultural school in Tashkent, Uzbekistan

Coordinates: 41.3622°N 69.3406°E

- Toshkent davlat agrar universiteti
- Former names: Tashkent State Agrarian University
- Established: 1930
- President: Sulaymonov Botirjon Abdushukurovich
- Location: Tashkent, Uzbekistan
- Language: Uzbek, Russian
- Website: tdau.uz

Tashkent State Agrarian University (Uzbek: Toshkent davlat agrar universiteti, Russian: Ташкентский государственный аграрный университет) or TSAU is an agricultural university located in Tashkent, Uzbekistan.

== History ==
The formation of Tashkent State Agrarian University was closely linked with the name of Mirzo Ulugbek National University, founded in 1918 by local intellectuals, as many other Central Asian universities. In the 1920s, there were 8 faculties among them there were agricultural ones. On May 26, 1930, on the basis of this faculty, the Central Asian Agricultural Institute was established and after some changes, it was renamed the Tashkent Agricultural Institute in October 1934. In April 1991, the university received the status of Tashkent State Agrarian University.

== Courses ==
This university offers the following courses—

- The Faculty of Agrobiology
  - Bachelor's degree
    - Agronomy (by types of agricultural products)
    - Breeding and seed production of agricultural crops (by type of crop)
  - Master's degree
    - Agronomy
    - Crop production (by crop groups)
- Faculty of Fruit and vegetable grooving and viticulture
  - Bachelor's degree
    - Fruit growing and viticulture
    - Horticulture, vegetable and potato growing
    - Organization and maintenance of greenhouses
    - Agrobiotechnology
    - Ecological safety in agriculture
  - Master's degree
    - Potato growing
    - Fruit growing and vegetable grooving on secure soil
    - Vegetable growing and horticulture
    - Biotechnologies in fruit and vegetable growing
    - Fruit growing
- Faculty of Plant Protection and Agrochemistry
  - Bachelor's degree
    - Agrochemistry and agrarian soil
    - Plant protection
    - Quarantine of plants and agricultural products
  - Master's degree
    - Agro soil science and agrophysics (by branches)
    - Agrochemistry
    - Plant protection (by methods)
    - Entomology
    - Herbal medicine
    - Quarantine of plants and agricultural products
- Faculty of storage and processing of products based on innovative technologies
  - Bachelor's degree
    - Technology of storage and primary processing of agricultural products (by product type)
    - Standardization and certification of agricultural products
    - Agribusiness and investment activities
    - Agrologistics
    - Accounting in the agricultural industry
- Faculty silkworm and breeding
  - Bachelor's degree
    - Sericulture and tuticulture
    - Fishing
  - Master's degree
    - Sericulture
    - Fishbreeding
    - Mulberry
- Forestry and ornamental gardening
  - Bachelor's degree

== See also ==
- TEAM University Tashkent
- Turin Polytechnic University in Tashkent
- Inha University in Tashkent
- Tashkent State Technical University
- Tashkent Institute of Irrigation and Melioration
- Tashkent Financial Institute
- Tashkent Automobile and Road Construction Institute
- Management Development Institute of Singapore in Tashkent
- Tashkent State University of Economics
- Tashkent State Agrarian University
- Tashkent State University of Law
- Tashkent University of Information Technologies
- University of World Economy and Diplomacy
- Westminster International University in Tashkent
