= List of banks in Uzbekistan =

This is a list of banks in Uzbekistan.

== Central bank ==
- Central Bank of Uzbekistan

== Commercial banks ==
Full name	Call name	Established	Majority owner	Website
Joint-stock banks
The Joint-Stock Company "National Bank for Foreign Economic Activity of the Republic of Uzbekistan"	NBU	25.10.1991	Government	nbu.uz
"Uzbek Industrial and Construction Bank" Joint-Stock Commercial Bank	SQB	25.06.1991	Government	sqb.uz
Joint Stock Commercial Bank "Agrobank"	Agrobank	30.04.2009	Government	agrobank.uz
Joint-Stock Commercial Bank "Microcreditbank"	Microcreditbank	28.04.1993	Government	mkbank.uz
Joint-Stock Commercial Xalq Bank of the Republic of Uzbekistan	Xalq Banki	22.10.1993	Government	xb.uz
Joint Stock Company "Garant bank"	Garant Bank	12.05.1994	Private	garantbank.uz
Joint-Stock Commercial Bank "Business Development Bank"	BDB	30.09.2023	Government	brb.uz
Joint-Stock Commercial Bank "Turonbank"	Turonbank	20.09.1993	Government	turonbank.uz
The Joint-Stock Company "Asakabank"	Asakabank	19.01.1996	Government	asakabank.uz
Joint-Stock Innovation Commercial Bank "Ipak Yuli"	Ipak Yuli Bank	31.12.1990	Private	ipakyulibank.uz
Joint-Stock Commercial "Aloqabank"	Aloqabank	22.03.1995	Government	aloqabank.uz
Joint-Stock Commercial Mortgage Bank "Ipoteka-bank"	Ipoteka Bank	30.04.2005	OTP Bank (Hungary)	ipotekabank.uz
Joint-Stock Commercial Bank "Universal bank"	Universalbank	20.03.2001	Private	universalbank.uz
Joint Stock Commercial Bank "Kapitalbank"	Kapitalbank	07.04.2001	Uzum Group (~61.5%)	kapitalbank.uz
The Joint Stock Company "Octobank"	Octobank	23.06.2001	Private	octobank.uz
Joint-Stock Commercial Bank "ASIA ALLIANCE BANK"	Asia Alliance Bank	15.08.2009	Mustafa Abdurakhmanov (~77.6%)	aab.uz
Joint-Stock Commercial Bank "Madad Invest Bank"	Madad Invest Bank	22.10.2016	Private	madadinvestbank.uz
Joint-Stock Commercial Bank "AVO BANK"	AVO Bank	02.06.2017	Private	avobank.uz
The Joint-Stock Company "POYTAKHT BANK"	Poytaxt Bank	29.12.2018	Private	poytaxtbank.uz
The Joint-Stock Company "ANOR BANK"	Anorbank	22.08.2020	Olimov Anvarovich	anorbank.uz
Joint Stock Company "UZUM BANK"	Uzum Bank	01.11.2021	Uzum Group	uzumbank.uz
Joint Stock Company "Open bank"	Open Bank	24.12.2022	Private	openbank.uz
Joint Stock Company "APEX BANK"	Apex Bank	16.03.2023	Private	apexbank.uz
Joint Stock Company "HAYOT BANK"	Hayot Bank	16.03.2023	Private	hayotbank.uz
Joint Stock Company "Tayanch mikromoliya banki"	Tayanch Bank	06.11.2025	Private	tayanchbank.uz
Private banks
Private Joint Stock Bank "Trustbank"	Trastbank	21.06.1994	Private	trastbank.uz
Private Joint-Stock Commercial Bank "DAVR BANK"	Davr Bank	29.09.2001	Private	davrbank.uz
Private Joint Stock Commercial Bank "Orient Finans"	Orient Finans Bank (OFB)	19.06.2010	Private	ofb.uz
Foreign capital banks
The Joint-Stock Company "Invest Finance Bank"	InfinBank	24.12.2007	Various	infinbank.com
Joint Stock Commercial Bank with Foreign Capital "Hamkorbank"	Hamkorbank	29.07.2000	Ikram Ibragimov (~55.8%)	hamkorbank.uz
Joint Stock Company "KDB Bank Uzbekistan"	KDB Bank	01.03.1997	Korea Development Bank	kdb.uz
Joint-Stock Company "Ziraat Bank Uzbekistan"	Ziraat Bank	13.03.1993	Ziraat (Turkey)	ziraatbank.uz
"Saderat" Bank Joint Stock Company	Bank Saderat Tashkent	21.08.1999	Bank Saderat Iran	saderatbank.uz
Joint-Stock Commercial Bank "Tenge Bank"	Tenge Bank	18.05.2019	Halyk Bank (Kazakhstan)	tengebank.uz
Joint-Stock Commercial Bank "TBC Bank"	TBC	11.04.2020	TBC Bank (Georgia)	tbcbank.uz
