= List of companies of Uzbekistan =

Location of Uzbekistan

Uzbekistan is a doubly landlocked country in Central Asia. Uzbekistan's economy relies mainly on commodity production, including cotton, gold, uranium, and natural gas. Despite the declared objective of transition to a market economy, its government continues to maintain economic controls which imports in favour of domestic "import substitution".

For further information on the types of business entities in this country and their abbreviations, see "Business entities in Uzbekistan".

== Notable firms ==
Table: This list includes notable companies with primary headquarters located in the country. The industry and sector follow the Industry Classification Benchmark taxonomy. Organizations which have ceased operations are included and noted as defunct.

Notable companies Status: P=Private, S=State; A=Active, D=Defunct
Name	Industry	Sector	Headquarters	Founded	Notes	Status	
Artel Electronics	Consumer Goods	Home Appliances	Tashkent	2011	Home Appliance Manufacturer	P	A
Avialeasing	Industrials	Delivery services	Tashkent	1992	Cargo airline	P	A
Central Bank of Uzbekistan	Financials	Banks	Tashkent	1991	National bank	S	A
GM Uzbekistan	Consumer goods	Automobiles	Asaka	2008	Automobiles, joint with General Motors (US)	P	A
MAN Auto-Uzbekistan	Consumer goods	Automobiles	Tashkent	2009	Automobiles, joint with MAN Truck & Bus (Germany)	P	A
Navoi Mining and Metallurgical Company (NMMC)	Basic materials	General mining	Navoiy	1958	Uranium, gold and silver	S	A
O'zelectroapparat-Electroshield	Industrials	Electrical equipment	Tashkent	1941	Power equipment manufacturing	P	A
O′zbekiston Pochtasi	Industrials	Delivery services	Tashkent	1991	Postal services	S	A
SamKochAvto	Industrials	Commercial vehicles & trucks	Samarkand	1999	Buses, joint with Koç Holding (Turkey)	P	A
Tashkent Aviation Production Association	Industrials	Aerospace	Tashkent	1932	Aircraft production	P	A
Uzbekistan Railways	Industrials	Railroads	Tashkent	1994	National railways	S	A
Uzbekistan Airways	Consumer services	Airlines	Tashkent	1992	Airline	P	A
Uzbekneftegaz	Oil & gas	Exploration & production	Tashkent	1992	State oil and gas	S	A
UzAuto	Consumer goods	Automobiles	Tashkent	1992	Automobiles, joint with GM	S	A
Uzmetkombinat	Basic materials	Metallurgy / Steel production	Bekabad	1944	Steel, ferroalloys, non-ferrous metals, enameled steelware, industrial gases	P	A
Uz-DaewooAuto	Consumer goods	Automobiles	Asaka	1992	Joint with Daewoo Motors, defunct 2008	P	D

== Gallery ==
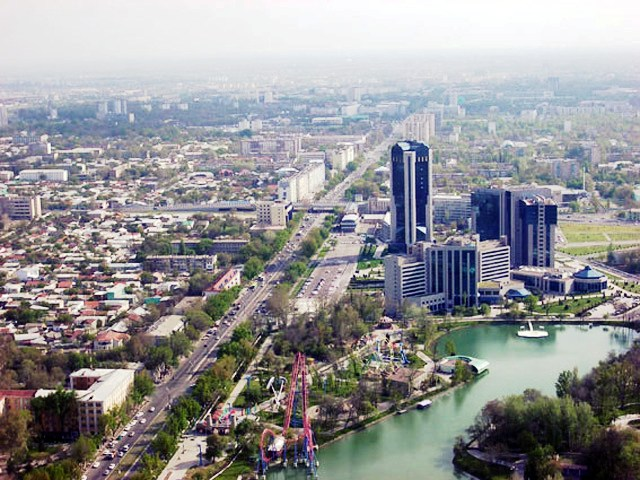
Commercial buildings in Tashkent.

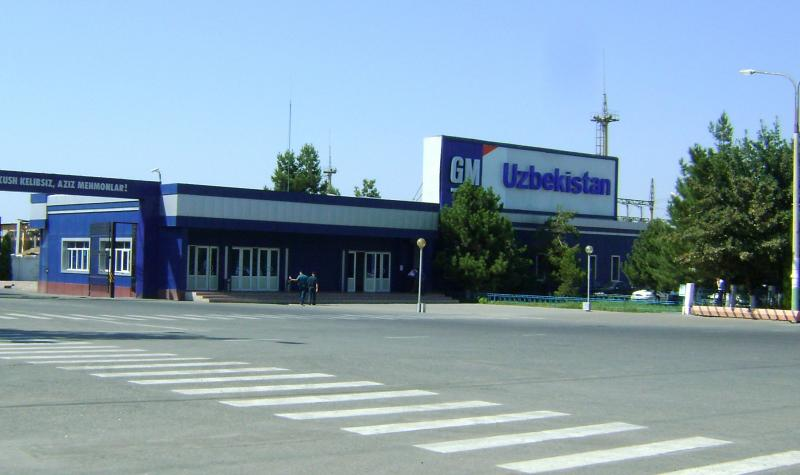
GM Uzbekistan factory in Asaka.

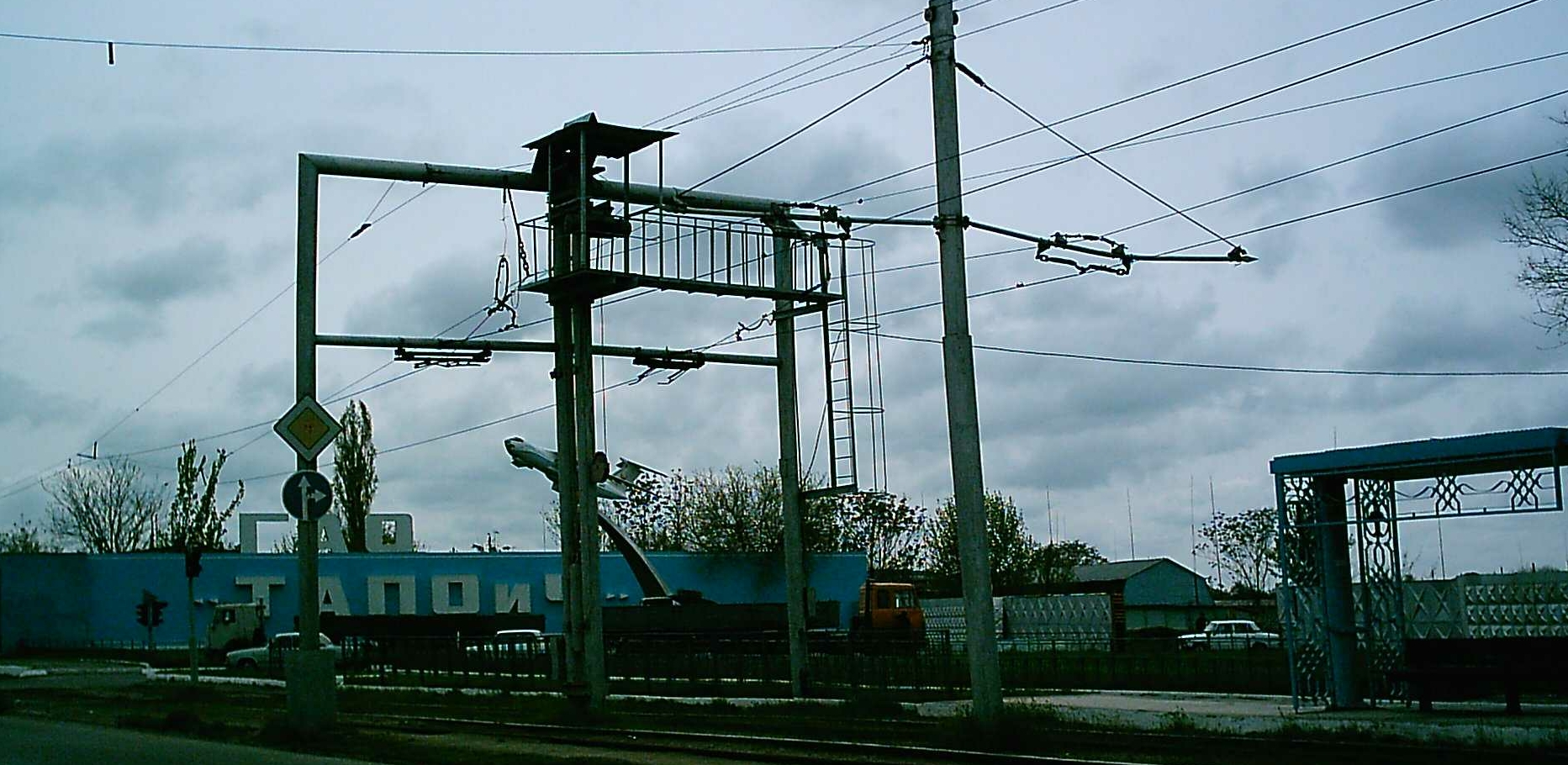
Entrance of Tashkent Aviation Production Association.

== See also ==
- Economy of Uzbekistan
