= Aloqabank =

Uzbek banking and financial services company

AT AloqaBank АлокаБанк
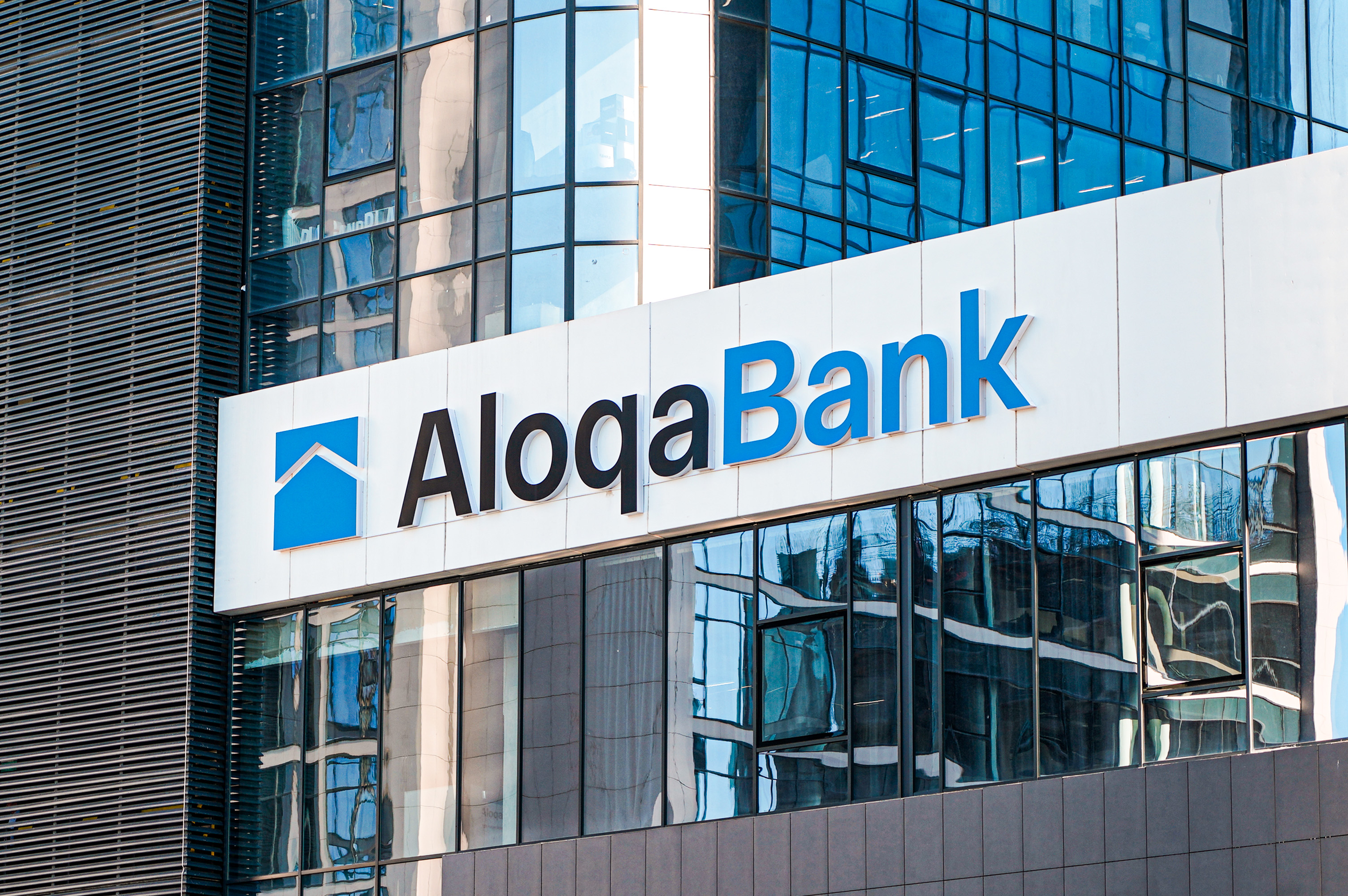
- Company type: Public (Joint-stock company)
- ISIN: UZ7044760005
- Industry: Banking, financial services
- Founded: March 22, 1994; 32 years ago
- Headquarters: Tashkent, Uzbekistan
- Key people: Kammuna Irisbekova (Chairman of the Board); Sukhrat Sadikov (Chairman of the Supervisory Board)
- Products: Consumer banking Corporate banking Finance; Mortgage loans Savings; Debit cards
- Operating income: ▲33.816 billion soum (2015, IFRS); 25.348 billion soum (2014, IFRS)
- Net income: ▲27.039 billion soum (2015, IFRS); 20.322 billion soum (2014, IFRS)
- Total assets: ▲1.188 trillion soum (2015, IFRS); 1.006 trillion soum (2014, IFRS)
- Total equity: ▲173.843 billion soum (2015, IFRS); 140.127 billion soum (2014, IFRS)
- Number of employees: 1 157 (July, 2016)
- Capital ratio: 13.9% (2015)
- Website: www.aloqabank.uz

Joint-Stock Commercial Aloqabank (Aloqabank, Russian: Акционерно-коммерческий «Алокабанк», Uzbek: Aksiyadorlik Tijorat "Aloqabank", Акциядорлик Тижорат "Алоқабанк") is an Uzbek banking and financial services company headquartered in Tashkent.

== History ==
Aloqabank was founded under the Resolution of the Cabinet of Ministers of the Republic of Uzbekistan No. 502 on October, 12th in 1994 to support the development of the telecommunication industry.

== Ownership ==
At 1 July 2016, the interest of the shareholders in the Bank’s share capital was:

No.	Company	Proportion in %
1	Center of Electromagnetic Compatibility	21.36
2	Fund of the Development of Information-Communication Technologies	21.36
3	JSC "Uzbektelecom"	18.97
4	Tashkent University of Information Technologies	6.45
5	JSC "Alskom" Insurance Company	6.44
6	Mekhnat Pivo LLC	4.76
7	The Ministry for Development of Information Technologies and Communications of the Republic of Uzbekistan	2.70
8	SUE "The Center of a radio communication, broadcasting and television"	2.41
9	Agricultural Company "Mekhnat" LLC	2.17
10	"DD General Insurance" LLC	1.59
11	JSC "Uzbekiston Pochtasi"	1.22
12	Other shareholders	10.57

== Management ==
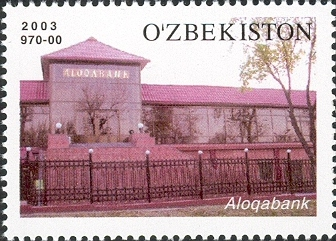

The Chairman of the Board (CEO) is Kammuna Irisbekova, confirmed by the General Meeting of Shareholders in September 2017.

The Chairman of the Supervisory Board of Aloqabank is Sherzod Shermatov, Acting Minister of Development of Information Technologies and Communications of the Republic of Uzbekistan.

== Main business ==
The main business activities of the bank are:

=== Retail Banking ===
- automated teller machines
- deposits taking
- provision of loans
- local and international payments and settlements
- debit cards

=== Corporate Banking ===
- bills acceptance and discounting
- issuing of financial bonds
- provision of letters of credit and guarantee facilities
- bank card business

Aloqabank is a participant of:

- Uzbekistan Banking Association
- Currency Exchange of the Republic of Uzbekistan
- Fund for “Guaranteeing citizens' deposits in banks”
- “Tashkent” Republican Stock Exchange
- National payment system of Uzbekistan
- International payment system SWIFT
- International payment system VISA
- Association of Lessors of Uzbekistan.

== Operations ==
Bank provides a wide range of bank services to the enterprises of the real sector of the economy, small business, private entrepreneurship entities and population in amount of 350,000 through 14 branches, 23 minibanks, 105 operational cash offices and 22 international money transfer offices located in the Republic of Karakalpakstan, regions and Tashkent city.

== Financial indicators ==
According to the audited IFRS report by Deloitte & Touche as of year-end 2015, total assets comprised 1,188.4 billion soum; net profit and equity constituted 29.0 and 173.8 billion soum respectively.
Earnings per preference share (2015) accounted for 114 soum; earnings per ordinary share (2015) comprised 27 soum.
Tier 1 Capital Adequacy Ratio = 16.26%
Regulative Capital Adequacy Ratio = 17.01%

== Ratings ==
Credit ratings
Aloqabank
Agency	Category	Assigned rating
Moody’s Investors Service	Outlook	Stable
Moody’s Investors Service	Bank deposits – Foreign Currency	B2/NP
Moody’s Investors Service	Bank deposits – Domestic currency	B1/NP
Moody’s Investors Service	Baseline Credit Assessment	B2
Moody’s Investors Service	Counterparty Risk Assessment	B1(cr)/NP(cr)
Ahbor–Reyting (National Rating Company)	Outlook	Stable
Ahbor–Reyting (National Rating Company)	Creditworthiness	uzA+ (Very High)

== See also ==
- Banking in Uzbekistan
- Central Bank of Uzbekistan
