= Economy of Uzbekistan =

- Tashkent, the capital and financial center of Uzbekistan
- Currency: Sum (UZS)
- Fiscal year: Calendar year
- Trade organisations: CIS, ECO, SCO, CISFTA, WTO (observer)
- Country group: Developing/Emerging; Lower-middle income economy

Statistics
- Population: ▲39, 047,321 (2026)
- GDP: ▲$181.5 billion (nominal, 2026f); ▲$552.16 billion (PPP, 2026f)
- GDP rank: 58th (nominal, 2026); 53rd (PPP, 2026)
- GDP growth: ▲6.0% (2026f); ▲5.7% (2027f)
- GDP per capita: ▲$4,661 (nominal, 2026f); ▲$14,179 (PPP, 2026f)
- GDP per capita rank: 129th (nominal, 2026); 116th (PPP, 2026)
- GDP by sector: agriculture: 17.3%; industry: 26.8%; services: 48.6%; (2025 est.)
- Inflation (CPI): ▼5.5% (2026)
- Population below national poverty line: 4.8% (2026 est.); ▼5% on less than $3.65/day (2022)
- Gini coefficient: 33.0
- Human Development Index: ▲0.757 high (2022) (106th); 0.720 high (2020)
- Labour force: ▲21,798,410 (2026); ▲54.8% employment rate (2026)
- Labour force by occupation: agriculture: 28.2%; industry: 28.4%; services: 43.4%; (2026 est.)
- Unemployment: ▼4.3% (2026); 9% underemployed (2024 est.)
- Youth unemployment: ▲11.4% (2025)
- Average gross salary: UZS 6,825,900 (US$540) per month
- Average net salary: UZS 6,006,792 (US$475) per month
- Main industries: automotive, textiles, food processing, machine building, metallurgy, mining, hydrocarbon extraction, chemicals

External
- Exports: ▲$33,8 billion (2025)
- Export goods: energy products, cotton, gold, mineral fertilizers, ferrous and nonferrous metals, textiles, foodstuffs, machinery, automobiles
- Main export partners: Switzerland 26.9%; United Kingdom 15.5%; EEU 21.68%; Russia 13.1%; Kazakhstan 5.60%; Kyrgyzstan 2.22%; China 8.83%; Turkey 5.08%; EU 4.49%; Lithuania 0.96%; France 0.71%; Afghanistan 4.04% (2024)
- Imports: ▲$47,4 billion (2025)
- Import goods: machinery and equipment, foodstuffs, chemicals, ferrous and nonferrous metals
- Main import partners: EEU 30.25%; Russia 20.4%; Kazakhstan 7.56%; Belarus 1.37%; China 29.9%; EU 12.78%; Germany 2.88%; Italy 1.19%; Turkey 5.77%; South Korea 5.26%; Turkmenistan 2.69%; India 2.06% (2024)
- FDI stock: ▲$11.9 billion (2024)
- Current account: ▼ -$5.79 billion (2026)
- Gross external debt: ▲$82.2 billion (2026)

Public finance
- Government debt: ▲27.1% of GDP (2026)
- Foreign reserves: ▲$75,08 billion (2026)
- Budget balance: balance: −2.1% (of GDP) (2025 est.)
- Revenue: ▲$89.6 billion (31 December 2025)
- Spending: $33.2 billion (2026)
- Economic aid: $172.3 million from the U.S. (2005)
- Credit rating: Standard & Poor's: BB stable, May 2026; Fitch: BB positive, June 2026; Moody's: Ba2 stable, June 2026
- All values, unless otherwise stated, are in US dollars.

Uzbekistan has a fast-growing developing economy that is moving away from an old Soviet-style command system towards a modern market economy. It is the second largest economy in Central Asia, after Kazakhstan. Following deep economic reforms that made the local currency fully exchangeable, the country has experienced a significant surge in foreign investment. This shift brought in a record volume of foreign direct investment, heavily backed by international partners such as China, Russia, Turkey, Saudi Arabia, and the UAE.

Under the administration of Islam Karimov, currency conversion capacity was restricted, imports were controlled, and Uzbekistan's borders with neighbouring Kazakhstan, Kyrgyzstan, and Tajikistan were sporadically closed. Since the election of President Shavkat Mirziyoyev, economic and social reforms have been implemented to boost growth and modernise the country. International financial institutions, including the EBRD, the Asian Development Bank, and the World Bank, are supportive of the reform process and have increased their presence in the country. Uzbekistan is a major producer and exporter of cotton. In 2022, the Cotton Campaign and other agencies, including the US Government, lifted all bans on the import of cotton that had been imposed due to international human rights concerns.

Uzbekistan is also a major producer of gold, with the largest open-pit gold mine in the world. The country has substantial deposits of silver, strategic minerals, gas, and oil. Since 2016, significant economic reforms have been undertaken in Uzbekistan. In 2017, the country liberalised its currency, allowing freer flows of foreign currency and facilitating the import and export of goods, as well as opening the path to foreign investment. Tax reforms in 2019 also allowed for company consolidation, tax simplification, and the professionalisation of the private sector. The government is also committed to the privatisation of state-owned enterprises (SOEs), with the domestic IPO of UzAuto expected in 2022.

The Uzbekistan Economic Forum, run by the Ministry of Finance, brings together IFIs, businesses, government officials, and other stakeholders on an annual basis. The first forum was held in Tashkent, and the second Uzbekistan Economic Forum took place in Samarkand. In December 2022, the Uzbek government received a loan of almost US$1 billion from the World Bank to 'implement strategic reforms'.

== History ==
During the Soviet era, Uzbekistan's economy was centrally planned and designed to specialise in agricultural production, specifically cotton, which was famously dubbed the 'white gold' of the Soviet economy. Following independence in 1991, the country experienced an economic downturn but avoided rapid shock therapy. The government instead maintained heavy state control over key industries, currency exchange, and agriculture, which involved heavy reliance on forced labour during the annual cotton harvest. While the country benefited from immense mineral wealth (including vast gold reserves and natural gas deposits), closed borders and restrictive foreign investment limited broader economic progress.

In 2017, with the launch of comprehensive economic reforms, the Uzbek government liberalised its currency by allowing it to float freely, significantly reduced its trade barriers, and actively courted foreign investment. The state officially eliminated the system of forced labour in the cotton sector and began transitioning its agricultural focus towards food self-sufficiency and high-value exports.

== GDP and employment ==
This is a chart depicting the trend of the gross domestic product in Uzbekistan in constant prices of 1995, estimated by the International Monetary Fund with figures in millions of sum. The chart also shows the consumer price index(CPI) as a measure of inflation from the same source and the end-of-year U.S. dollar exchange rate from the Central Bank of the Uzbekistan database. For purchasing power parity comparisons in 2006, the U.S. dollar is exchanged at 340 som.

Year	GDP (constant prices)	US Dollar Exchange	CPI (2000=100)
1992	330,042	1 soum	0.07
1995	302,790	36 soum	20
2000	356,325	325 soum	100
2003	402,361	980 soum	166
2006	497,525	1,240 soum	226

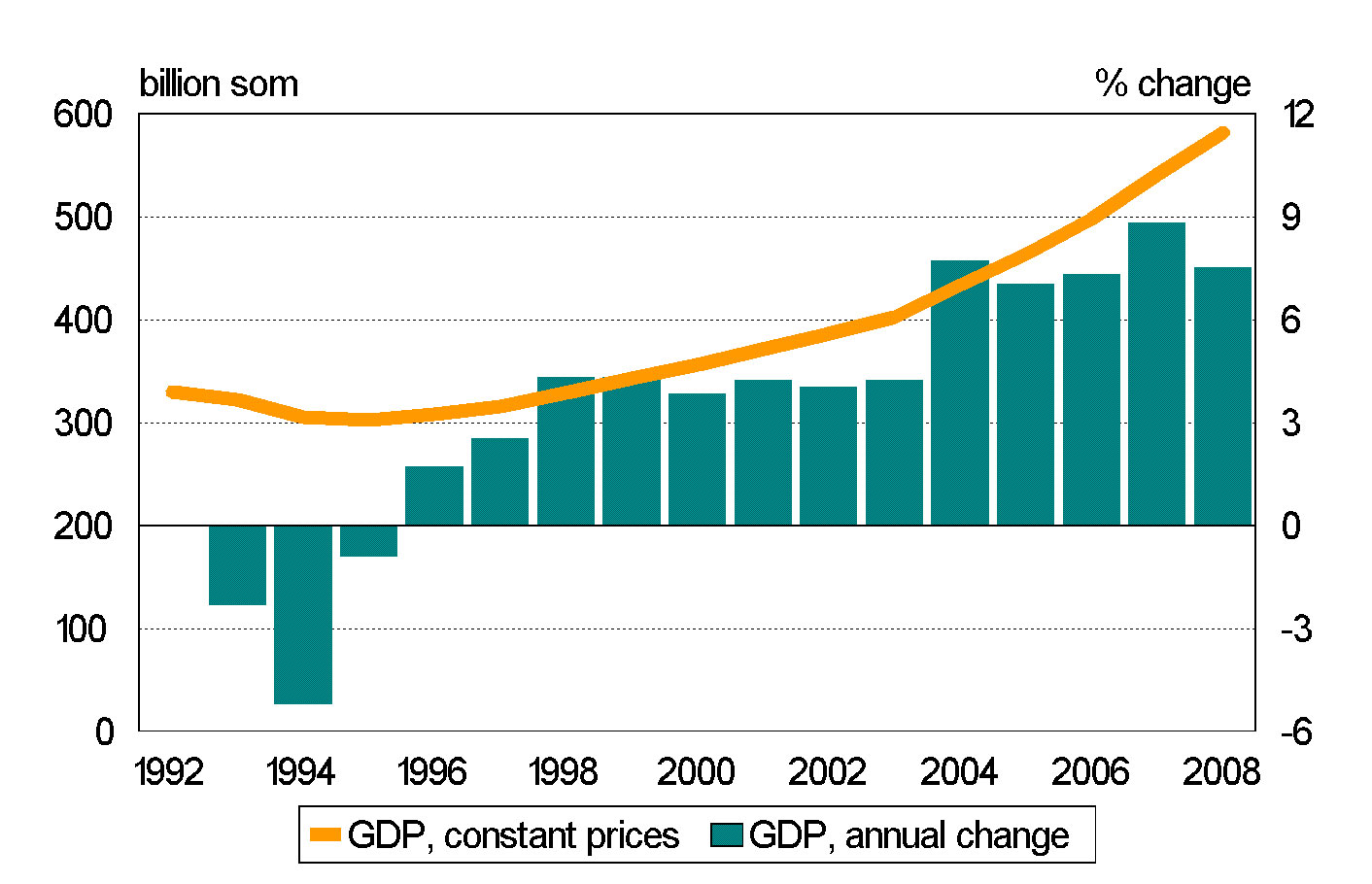
Uzbekistan: growth of GDP in constant prices 1992–2008

Uzbekistan's GDP, like that of all CIS countries, declined during the first years of transition and then recovered after 1995, as the cumulative effect of policy reforms began to be felt. It showed robust growth, rising by 4% per year between 1998 and 2003, and accelerating thereafter to 7–8% per year. In 2011 the growth rate rose to 9%.

Given the growing economy, the total number of people employed rose from 8.5 million in 1995 to 13.5 million in 2011. This increase of nearly 25% in the labor force lagged behind the increase in GDP during the same period (64%, see chart), which implied a significant increase in labor productivity. Official unemployment is low: less than 30,000 job seekers were registered in government labor exchanges in 2005–2006 (0.3% of the labor force). Underemployment, on the other hand, is quite high, especially in agriculture, which accounts for fully 28% of all employed, many working part-time on small household plots.

The minimum wage, public-sector wages, and old-age pensions are raised twice a year to ensure that base income is not eroded by inflation. Although no statistics are published on average wages in Uzbekistan, pensions as a proxy for the average wage increased significantly between 1995 and 2006, both in real terms and in U.S. dollars. The monthly old-age pension increased in real (CPI-adjusted) soums by almost a factor of 5 between 1995 and 2006. The monthly pension in U.S. dollars was around $20–$25 until 2000, then dropped to $15–$20 between 2001 and 2004, and now is $64. The minimum wage was raised to $34.31 in November 2011. Assuming that the average wages in the country are at a level of 3–4 times the monthly pension, we estimate the wages in 2006 at $100–$250 per month, or $3–$8 per day.

According to the forecast by the Asian Development Bank, the GDP in Uzbekistan in 2009 was expected to grow by 7%. Meanwhile, in 2010 the Uzbekistan GDP growth is predicted at 6,5%.

== Work force and vocational training ==
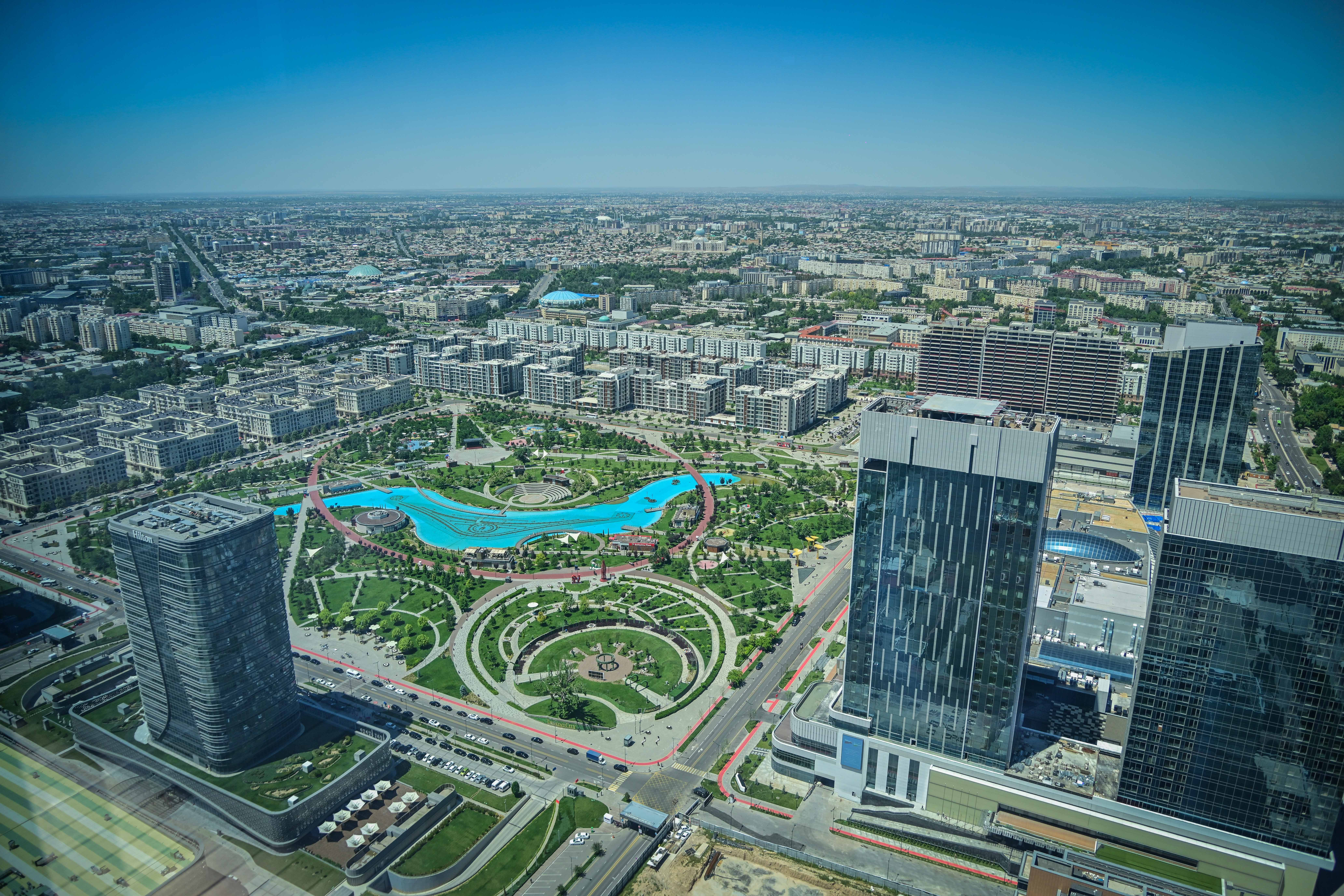
Tashkent City Park

Literacy in Uzbekistan is almost universal, but in order to meet labour force needs, hundreds of students are sent to the United States, Europe, and Japan for university degrees, after which they commit to working for the government for five years. About 60% of students who study abroad find employment with foreign companies upon completing their degrees, despite their commitment to work for the government.

In addition, Uzbekistan subsidises studies for students at Westminster International University in Tashkent—one of the few Western-style institutions in Uzbekistan. In 2002, the government's 'Istedod' Foundation (formerly the 'Umid' Foundation) paid for 98 out of 155 students studying at Westminster. For the following academic year, Westminster admitted 360 students, with Istedod paying for 160. Tuition is $5,200 per academic year.

In 2008, the Management Development Institute of Singapore in Tashkent opened to provide high-quality education with international degrees. The tuition fee was $5,000 in 2012. In 2009, Turin Polytechnic University was opened. It is the only university in Central Asia that prepares high-quality employees for industry.

With the closing or downsizing of many foreign firms, it is relatively easy to find qualified employees, though salaries are very low by Western standards. Salary caps, which the government implements in an apparent attempt to prevent firms from circumventing restrictions on withdrawal of cash from banks, prevent many foreign firms from paying their workers as much as they would like. Labor market regulations in Uzbekistan are similar to those of the Soviet Union, with all rights guaranteed but some rights unobserved. Unemployment is a growing problem, and the number of people looking for jobs in Russia, Kazakhstan, and Southeast Asia is increasing each year. Uzbekistan's Ministry of Labor does not publish information on Uzbek citizens working abroad, but Russia's Federal Migration Service reports 2.5 million Uzbek migrant workers in Russia. There are also indications of up to 1 million Uzbek migrants working illegally in Kazakhstan. Uzbekistan's migrant workers may thus be around 3.5–4 million people, or a staggering 25% of its labor force of 14.8 million. The U.S. Department of State also estimates that between three and five million Uzbek citizens of working age live outside Uzbekistan.

After acknowledging the need for more higher education to support labor market needs, new programs were opened and cooperation commenced with foreign universities. Moreover, private higher education providers started to emerge on the market to provide students with necessary skills, knowledge and competencies required on the labor market. One of the private universities in Tashkent TEAM University aims at development of skills necessary for starting entrepreneurial activities, thus contributing to development of businesses and private enterprises.

== Fiscal and monetary policy ==
Uzbekistan experienced galloping inflation of around 1000% per year immediately after independence (1992–1994). Stabilization efforts implemented with active guidance from the International Monetary Fund rapidly paid off, as inflation rates were brought down to 50% in 1997 and then to 22% in 2002. Since 2003 annual inflation rates averaged less than 10%.

The severe inflationary pressures that characterized the early years of independence inevitably led to a dramatic depreciation of the national currency. The exchange rate of Uzbekistan's first currency, the "notional" rouble inherited from the Soviet period and its successor, the transient "coupon soum" introduced in November 1993 in a ratio of 1:1 to the rouble, went up from 100 roubles/US$ in the early 1992 to 3,627 roubles (or coupon soum) in mid-April 1994. On July 1, 1994, the "coupon soum" was replaced with the permanent new Uzbek soum (UZS) in a ratio of 1000:1, and the starting exchange rate for the new national currency was set at 7 soum/US$, implying an almost two-fold depreciation since mid-April. Within the first six months, between July and December 1994, the national currency depreciated further to 25 soum/US$ and continued depreciating at a fast clip until December 2002, when the exchange rate had reached 969 soum/US$, i.e., 138 times the starting exchange rate eight and a half years earlier or nearly 10,000 times the exchange rate in early 1992, soon after the declaration of independence. Then the depreciation of the soum virtually stopped in response to the government's stabilization program, which at the same time dramatically reduced the inflation rates. During the four years that followed (2003–2007) the exchange rate of the soum to the US dollar increased only by a factor of 1.33, from 969 soum to around 1,865 soum in May 2012.

From 1996 until the spring of 2003, the official and so-called "commercial" exchange rate – both set administratively by the Central Bank – were highly overvalued. Many businesses and individuals were unable to buy dollars legally at these "low" rates, so a widespread black market developed to meet hard currency demand. The spread between the official exchange rate and the curb rate widened especially after the 1998 Russian financial crisis: at the end of 1999 the curb rate stood at 550 soum/US$ compared with the official rate of 140 soum/US$, a gap by nearly a factor of 4 (up from a factor of "only" 2 in 1997 and the first half of 1998). By mid-2003, the government's stabilization and liberalization efforts had reduced the gap between the black market, official, and commercial rates to approximately 8% and it quickly disappeared as the soum was made convertible after October 2003. Today, four foreign currencies—the U.S. dollar, the euro, the pound sterling, and the yen—are freely exchanged in commercial booths all around the cities, while other currencies, including the Russian rouble and the Kazakh tenge, are bought and sold by individual ("black market") money changers, who are allowed to operate openly without harassment. The foreign exchange regime since October 2003 is characterized as "controlled floating rate". Liberalization of the trade regime remains a prerequisite for Uzbekistan to proceed to an IMF-financed program. In 2012, "black market" rate is again significantly higher than official rate, 2,850 soum/US$ vs. 1,865 soum/US$ (as of mid-June 2011). This curb rate is often referred to as 'bazar rate', because money changers operate at or near 'bazars' – large farmer markets.

Tax collection rates remained high, due to the use of the banking system by the government as a collection agency. Technical assistance from the World Bank, Office of Technical Assistance at the U.S. Treasury Department, and UNDP is being provided in reforming the Central Bank and Ministry of Finance into institutions capable of conducting market-oriented fiscal and monetary policy.

== Sectors ==
=== Agriculture ===
Agriculture in Uzbekistan employs 28% of labor force and contributes 24% of GDP (2006 data). Another 8% of GDP is from processing of domestic agricultural output. Cotton, once Uzbekistan's star cash earner, has lost much its luster since independence as wheat began to gain prominence from considerations of food security for the rapidly growing population. Areas cropped to cotton were reduced by more than 25% from 2 million hectares in 1990 to less than 1.5 million hectares in 2006, while wheat cultivation jumped 60% from around 1 million hectares in 1990 to 1.6 million hectares in 2006. Cotton production dropped from 3 million tons annually in the pre-independence decade to around 1.2 million tons since 1995, but even at these reduced levels Uzbekistan produces 3 times as much cotton as all the other Central Asian countries and Azerbaijan combined. Cotton exports tumbled from highs of around 45% of Uzbekistan's total exports in the early 1990s to 17% in 2006. Uzbekistan is the largest producer of jute in West Asia and it also produces significant quantities of silk (Uzbek ikat), fruit, and vegetables, with food products contributing nearly 8% of total exports in 2006. Virtually all agriculture requires irrigation, but because of budgetary constraints there has been practically no expansion of irrigated area since independence: it remains static at 4.2 million hectares, the level reached by 1990 after rapid growth during the Soviet period.

In 2018, Uzbekistan produced:

- 5.4 million tonnes of wheat;
- 2.9 million tons of potato;
- 2.2 million tons of cotton (8th largest producer in the world);
- 2.2 million tons of tomato (14th largest producer in the world);
- 2.1 million tonnes of carrot (2nd largest producer in the world, just behind China);
- 1.8 million tons of watermelon (8th largest producer in the world);
- 1.5 million tons of grape (15th largest producer in the world);
- 1.4 million tons of onion (15th largest producer in the world);
- 1.1 million tons of apple (14th largest producer in the world);
- 857 thousand tons of cucumber (7th largest producer in the world);
- 743 thousand tons of cabbage;
- 493 thousand tons of apricot (2nd largest producer in the world, just behind Turkey);
- 413 thousand tons of maize;
- 254 thousand tons of garlic;
- 221 thousand tons of rice;
- 172 thousand tons of cherry;
- 161 thousand tons of peach;
- 134 thousand tons of plum (17th largest producer in the world);

In addition to smaller productions of other agricultural products.

At the end of 2013, the government announced through the Central Bank of the Republic of Uzbekistan that it predicted agriculture as playing a major component of the country's economic development in the future.

Government intervention in agriculture is reflected in the persistence of state orders for the two main cash crops, cotton and wheat. Farmers receive binding directives on the area to be cropped to these commodities and are obliged to surrender their harvest to designated marketers at state-fixed prices. The incomes of farmers and agricultural workers are substantially lower than the national average because the government pays them less than the world prices for their cotton and wheat, using the difference to subsidize capital intensive industrial concerns, such as factories producing automobiles, airplanes, and tractors. Consequently, many farmers focus on production of fruits and vegetables on their small household plots, because the prices of these commodities are determined by supply and demand, not by government decrees. Farmers also resort to smuggling cotton and especially wheat across the border with Kazakhstan and Kyrgyzstan in order to obtain higher prices.

The government's pricing for the main cash crops, cotton and wheat, is apparently responsible for the exceptionally rapid growth of the cattle herd in Dehkan farm in recent years, as the prices of milk and meat, like those of fruits and vegetables, are also determined by market forces. The number of cattle increased from 4 million head in 1990 to 7 million head in 2006, and virtually all these animals are maintained by rural families with just 2–3 head per household. Sales of own-produced milk, meat, and vegetables in town markets are an important source for augmenting rural family incomes.

The Soviet practice of using "volunteer child labor" to help gathering the cotton harvest continues in Uzbekistan where schoolchildren, university students, medical professionals, and state employees are driven en masse out to the fields every year. A recent article posted by a domestic news agency (admittedly with strong anti-government leanings) describes Uzbekistan's cotton as "riches gathered by the hands of hungry children".

=== Natural resources and energy ===
In 2019, the country was the 5th largest world producer of uranium; 12th largest world producer of gold; 7th largest world producer of rhenium; 12th largest world producer of molybdenum; 21st largest world producer of phosphate, and the 19th largest world producer of graphite

Minerals and mining are important economic sectors. Gold is the major foreign exchange earner, unofficially estimated at 20% of total exports. Uzbekistan is the world's seventh-largest gold producer, mining about 80 tons per year, and holds the fourth-largest reserves in the world. Uzbekistan has an abundance of natural gas, used both for domestic consumption and export; oil used for domestic consumption; and significant reserves of copper, lead, zinc, tungsten, and uranium. The Navoi Mining and Metallurgical Company is the main enterprise in the industry.

Energy use is generally high since the controlled prices do not stimulate consumers to conserve energy. Uzbekneftegaz is the main consortium in the oil and gas industry. Uzbekistan was a partner country of the EU INOGATE energy programme, which focused on enhancing energy security, convergence of member state energy markets on the basis of EU internal energy market principles, supporting sustainable energy development, and attracting investment for energy projects of common and regional interest.

=== Industries ===
The country's largest steel manufacturer is Uzmetkombinat. The company planned an IPO in 2023. UzAuto Motors dominated the Uzbek's automotive industry, producing nearly $4.85 billion worth of vehicles and controlling up to 90% of the domestic market. Murad Buildings is one of the largest real estate developers in Uzbekistan, known for Nest One, the tallest building in Uzbekistan and other major projects.

=== Banking ===
Uzbekistan's banks have demonstrated reasonably stable performance in a largely state-dominated local economy. Sector stability is currently supported by rapid economic growth, low exposure to external financial markets and the strong external and fiscal position of the sovereign. However, the sector remains vulnerable to possible economic shocks due to weak corporate governance and risk management, fast recent asset growth, significant directed lending and acquisitions of problem assets. Banks' foreign currency obligations, specifically those arising from trade finance, are particularly vulnerable due to existing foreign exchange constraints.

According to Fitch Ratings, there are notable risks of asset quality deterioration in case of a reversal in economic trends. The funding base is mainly short-term, largely sourced from corporate current accounts, while retail funds account for only a small 25% of total deposits. Longer-term funding is provided by the Ministry of Finance and other state agencies, which comprise a notable proportion of sector liabilities. Foreign funding is small, estimated at 10% of the total liabilities, and plans for further borrowings are moderate. Liquidity management is constrained be the lack of deep capital markets, and banks generally tend to hold substantial cash reserves on their balance sheets. The quality of capital is sometimes compromised by less conservative regulatory requirements for recognition of credit impairment and by investments in non-core assets.

=== Education ===
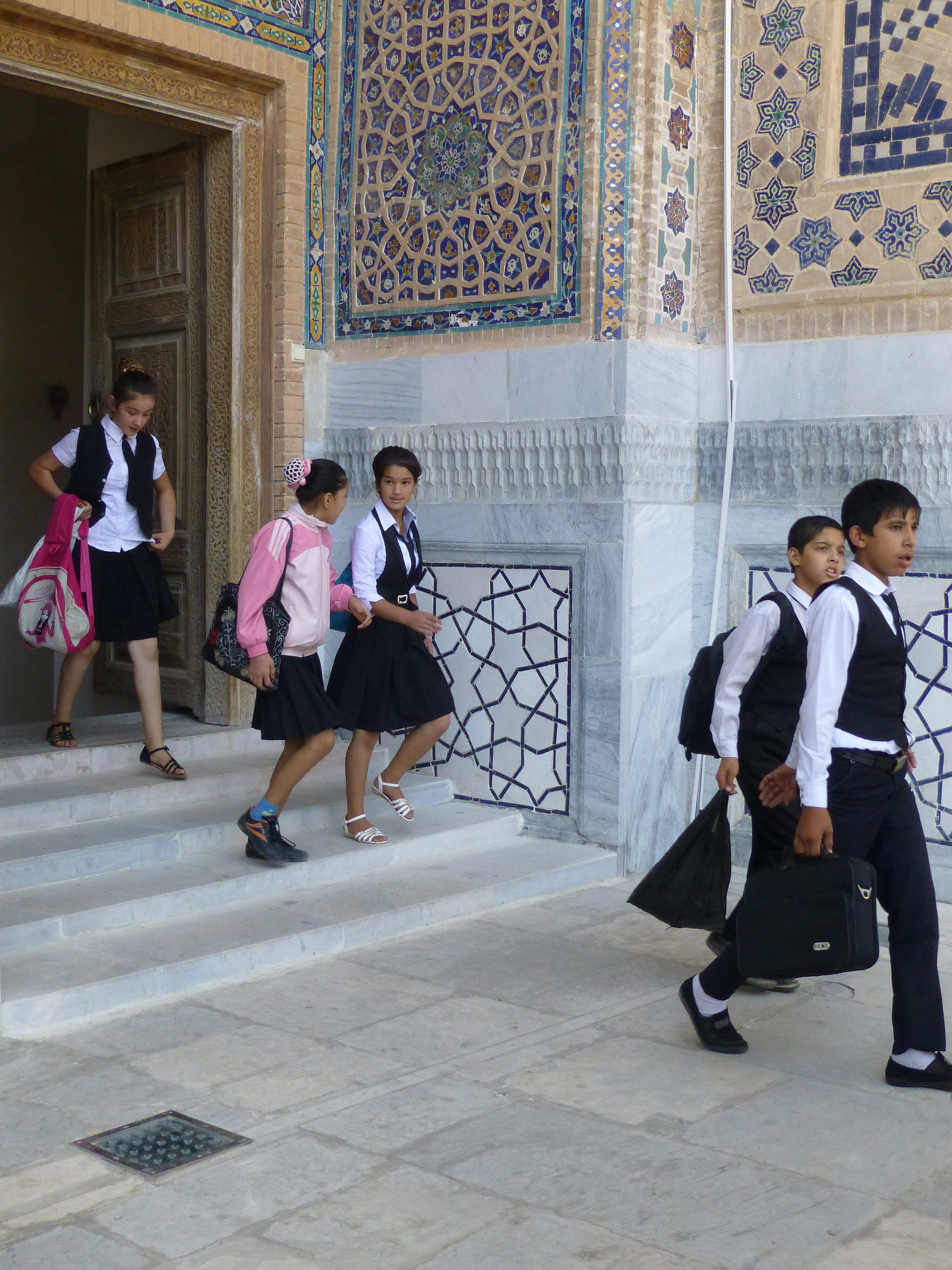
Uzbek students visiting Samarkand

Education in Uzbekistan is categorized by division into stages by age groups, and into different schools and classes by language of instruction. Majority of schooling in Uzbekistan is provided by the government, but there are some private institutions on all levels of education. The Uzbek grading scale runs from 2 (Very poor) to 5 (Excellent), and students attend school Monday through Saturday.

Uzbekistan's education system is generally managed by the Ministry of Education and Science, merged from the previous Ministries of Preschool and School Education and Higher Education, Science and Innovations, in October 2026.. Furthermore, there are agencies with roles in certain areas as prescribed by the President of Uzbekistan.

=== Healthcare ===
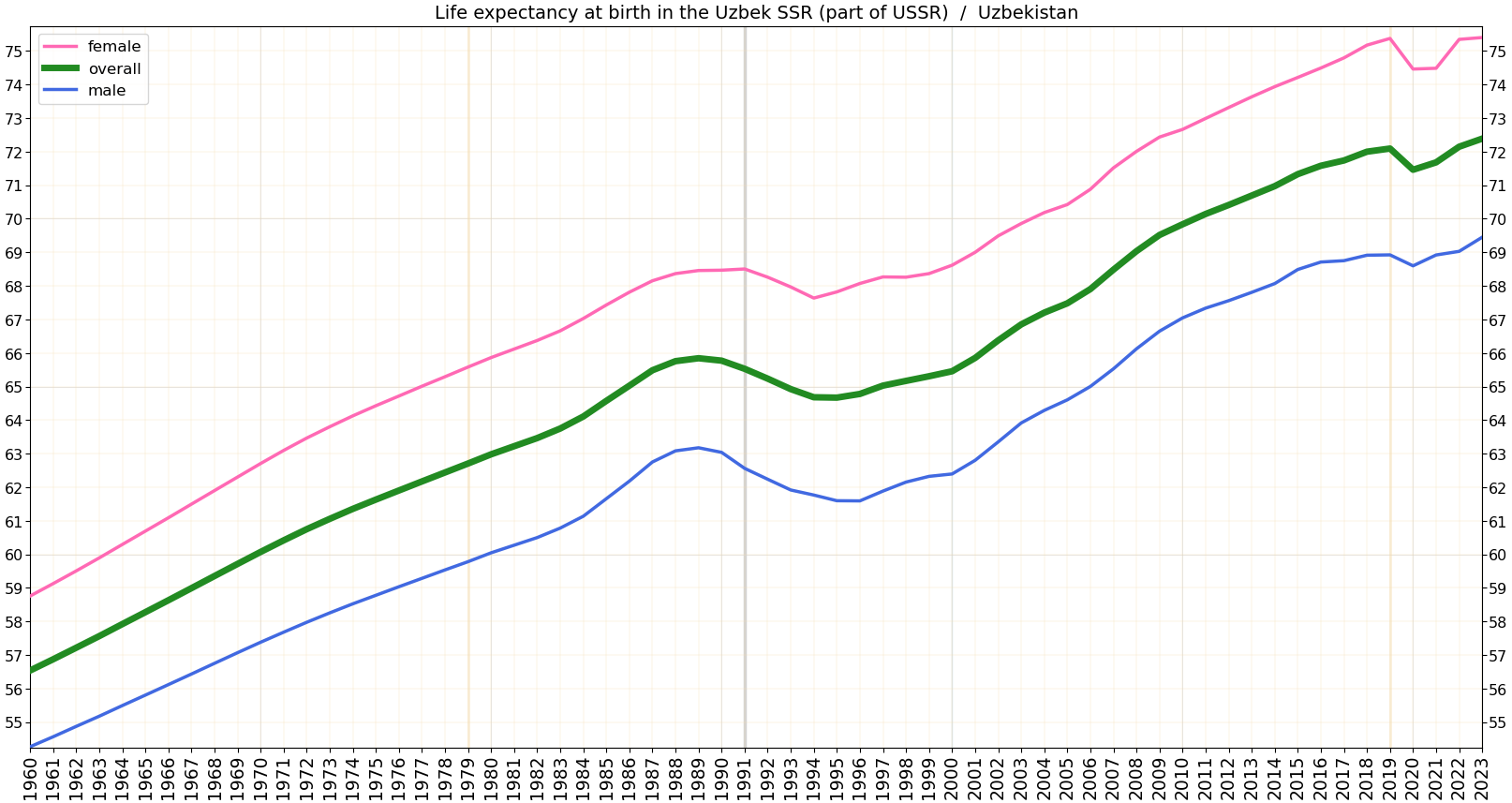
Life expectancy at birth in Uzbekistan

In the post-Soviet era, the quality of Uzbekistan’s health care has declined. Between 1992 and 2003, spending on health care and the ratio of hospital beds to population both decreased by nearly 50 percent, and Russian emigration in that decade deprived the health system of many practitioners. In 2004 Uzbekistan had 53 hospital beds per 10,000 population. Basic medical supplies such as disposable needles, anesthetics, and antibiotics are in very short supply. Although all citizens nominally are entitled to free health care, in the post-Soviet era bribery has become a common way to bypass the slow and limited service of the state system. In the early 2000s, policy has focused on improving primary health care facilities and cutting the cost of inpatient facilities. The state budget for 2006 allotted 11.1 percent to health expenditures, compared with 10.9 percent in 2005.

=== Retail ===
Uzbekistan's retail sector remains dominated by traditional markets, known as bozorlar (bazaars), where individual vendors sell food, housewares, clothing, and other consumer goods. But the country's retail sector is rapidly modernizing. The construction of modern supermarkets and malls has accelerated in recent years. The country's retail market was estimated at $17 billion in 2017 and rising incomes, population growth, and a move from informal to formal retail are expected to drive continued expansion of the sector.

Major supermarket chains include local players Korzinka.uz and Makro (Uzbekistan) and the French multinational chain Carrefour, which will open its first store in Uzbekistan in 2021. The country's first modern shopping malls are located in Tashkent, and include the Samarkand Darvoza and Compass developments. The sector has also seen growth in online retail. In 2021, Korzinka acquired a US$40m stake in Anglesey Food, the Singapore mother entity of Korzinka. In 2021, the company also signed a signed $12 million in debt financing to promote food security and sustain the livelihoods of more than 5,000 employees and 1,200 farm workers in Uzbekistan.

=== Telecommunications ===
Telecommunications networks in Uzbekistan are largely based on Soviet-built infrastructure, but with many modern additions, making the country one of the leading influences in the region in terms of information development.

In 2012, the telecommunications services volume grew by 22.5% year-on-year in Uzbekistan. The number of broadband ports installed totalled 378,000 across the country at the end of 2012, up by 55.5% year-on-year. The number of ports in active use was 202,700, up by 37.2%. A total of 1,576 km of fibre optic backbone lines were deployed across the country in the same year.

=== Transport ===
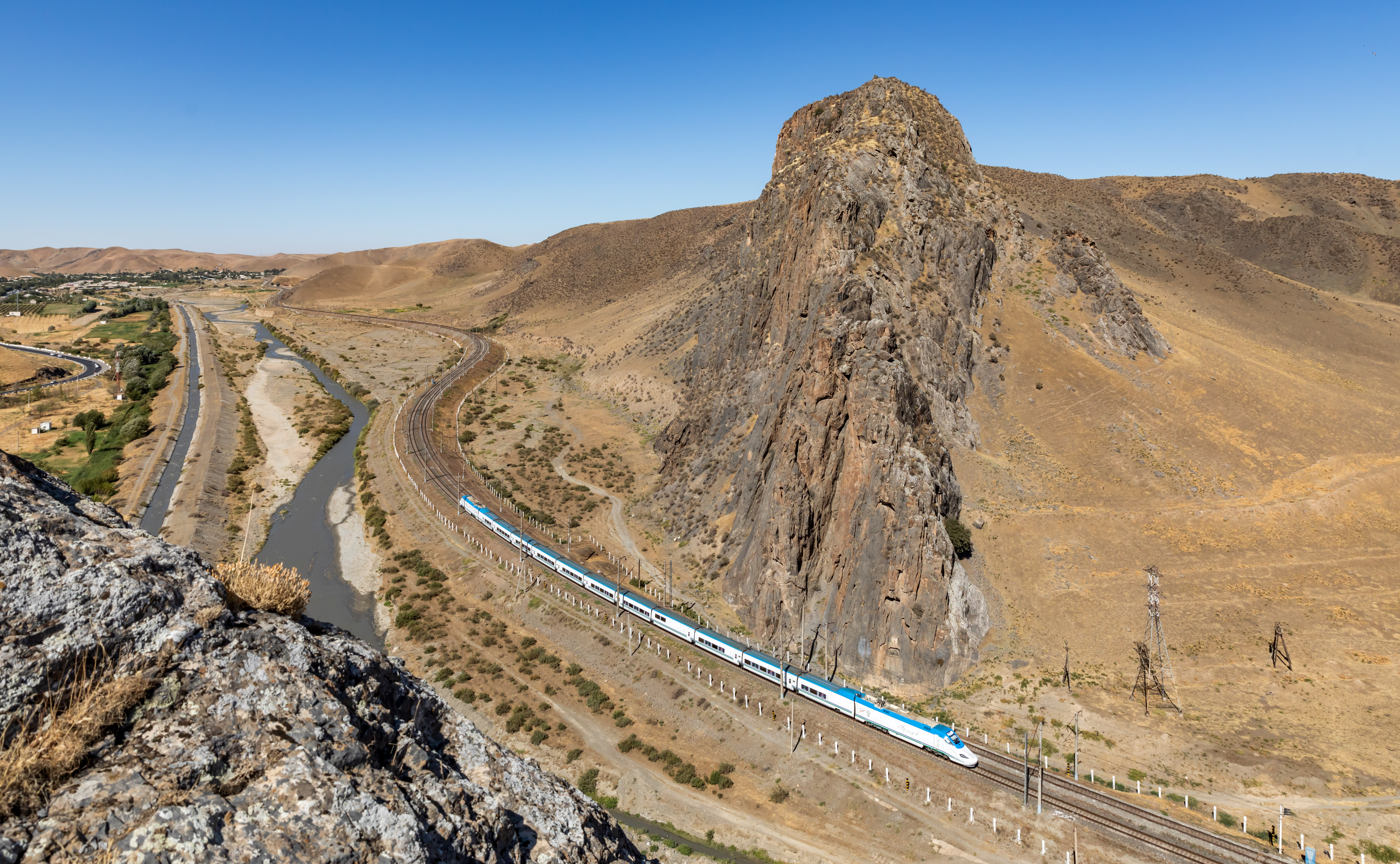
Afrosiyob train near Jizzax

Uzbekistan's overland transportation infrastructure declined in the post-Soviet era but Air transport received substantial government investment in the early 2000s as airport modernization projects were undertaken. Improvements have since been made to the surface transport network including the construction of the Tashkent–Samarkand high-speed rail line.

=== Tourism ===
Silk road route's three important cities are located in Uzbekistan, namely Khiva, Bukhara and Samarkand. There are numerous well connected tourist destinations in Uzbekistan. There are five UNESCO World Heritage Sites in Uzbekistan and 30 are on tentative list.

== External trade and investment ==
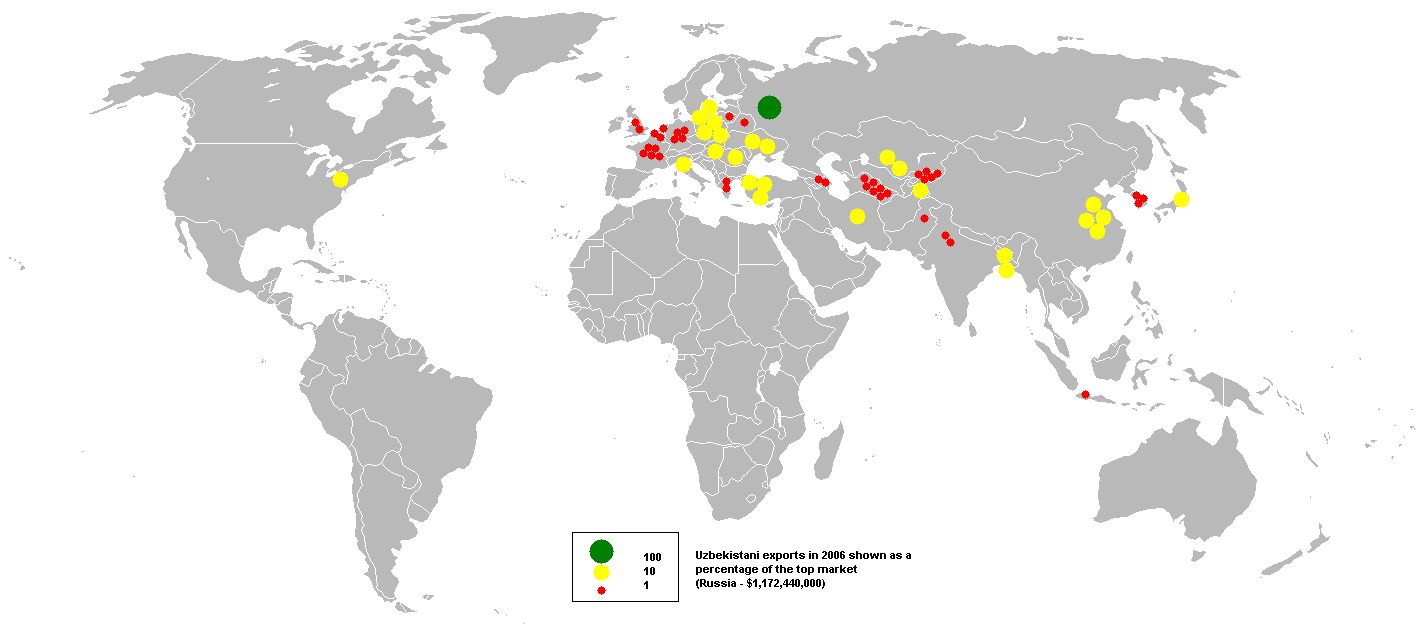
Uzbekistan export destinations in 2006

Exports of Uzbekistan by product category (2019) Chemical products Transportation Machines Mineral products Plastics and rubbers Metals Foodstuffs Precious metals Textiles Instruments Animal products Vegetable products Paper goods Footwear and headwear Miscellaneous Stone and glass Wood products Animal and vegetable bi-products Animal hides Arts and antiques Weapons

Since the 2017 liberalization of the foreign exchange market, Uzbekistan has seen rapid growth in exports. Traditional export products such as gas and cotton are now kept domestically for processing. They have been replaced by a vast growth in exports in areas such as fruit, textiles and home appliances. In recent years textile export has doubled in revenue to almost US$3bn worth of goods exports. Home appliance manufacturer Artel has seen exports rise from $5.6m in 2017, to around $100m in 2021.

Before this, the system of multiple exchange rates combined with the highly regulated trade regime caused both imports and exports to drop each from about US$4.5 billion in 1996 to less than US$3 billion in 2002. The success of stabilization and currency liberalization in 2003 has led to significant increases in exports and imports in recent years, although imports have increased much less rapidly: while exports had more than doubled to US$15.5 by 2011, imports had risen to US$6.5 billion only, reflecting the impact of the government's import substitution policies designed to maintain hard currency reserves. Draconian tariffs, sporadic border closures, and border crossing "fees" have a negative effect on legal imports of both consumer products and capital equipment.

Uzbekistan is a member of the International Monetary Fund, World Bank, Asian Development Bank, and European Bank for Reconstruction and Development. It has observer status at the World Trade Organization and the Eurasian Economic Union, is a member of the World Intellectual Property Organization, and is a signatory to the Convention on Settlement of Investment Disputes Between States and Nationals of Other States, the Paris Convention for the Protection of Industrial Property, the Madrid Agreement on Trademarks Protection, and the Patent Cooperation Treaty. In 2002, Uzbekistan was again placed on the special "301" Watch List for lack of intellectual copyright protection.

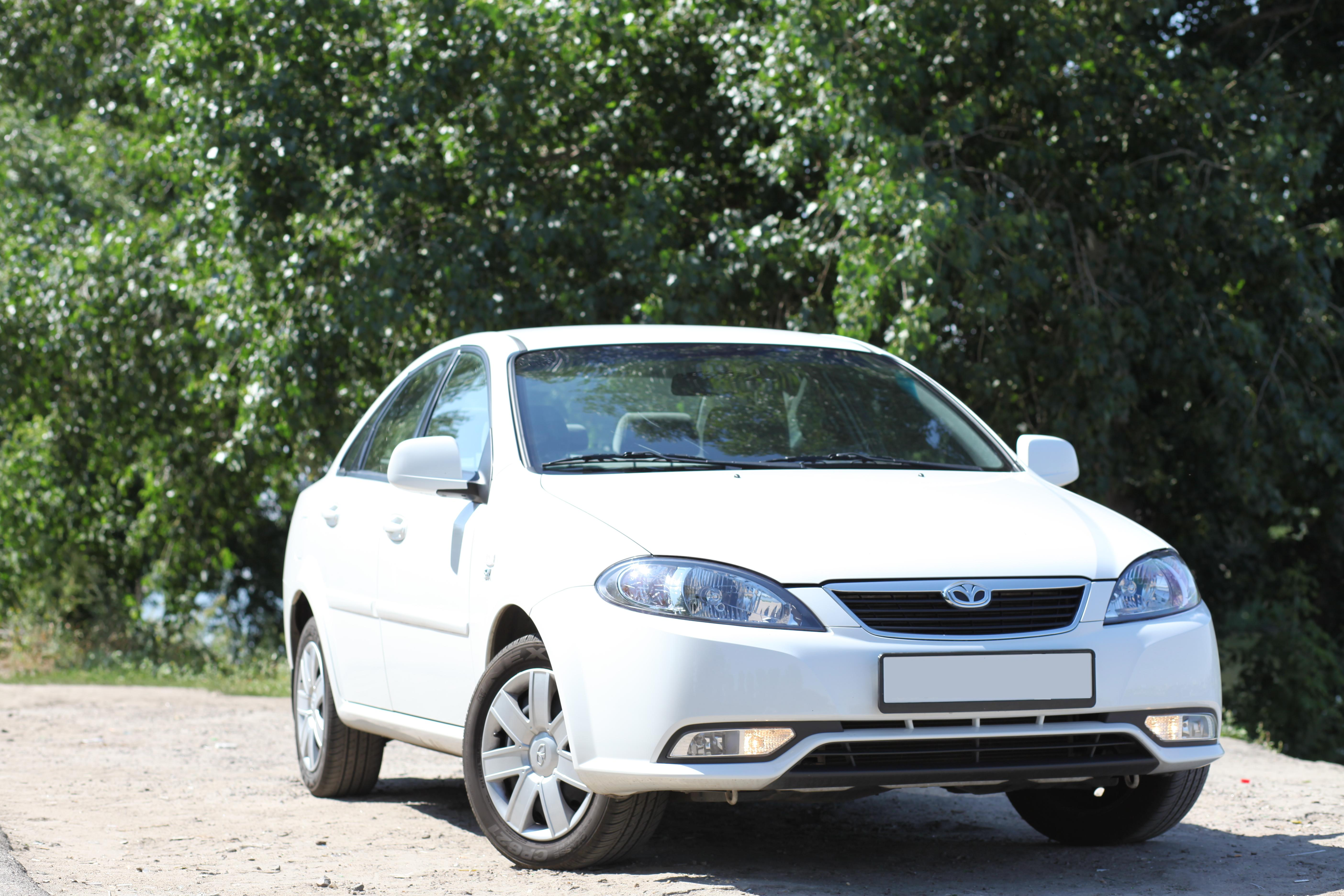
Daewoo Gentra is currently a flagship of UzDaewooAuto.

Until 2017, according to EBRD transition indicators, Uzbekistan's investment climate remains among the least favorable in the CIS, with only Belarus and Turkmenistan ranking lower. The unfavorable investment climate has caused foreign investment inflows to dwindle to a trickle. It is believed that Uzbekistan has the lowest level of foreign direct investment per capita in the CIS. Since Uzbekistan's independence, U.S. firms have invested roughly $500 million in the country, but due to declining investor confidence, harassment, and currency convertibility problems, numerous international investors have left the country or are considering leaving. In 2005, the Central Bank has revoked the license of the nascent Biznes Bank citing unspecified violations of local currency exchange rules. The revocation prompted immediate bankruptcy procedures, under which clients' deposits stay arrested for two month. No interest was accrued during that two-month period. In 2006, the Government of Uzbekistan forced out Newmont Mining Corporation (at the time the largest U.S. investor) from its gold mining joint venture in the Muruntau gold mine. Newmont and the government resolved their dispute, but the action adversely affected Uzbekistan's image among foreign investors. The government attempted the same with British-owned Oxus Mining. Coscom, a U.S.-owned telecommunications company, involuntarily sold its stake in a joint venture to another foreign company. GM-DAT, a Korean subsidiary of GM, is the only known U.S. business to have entered Uzbekistan in over two years. It recently signed a joint-venture agreement with UzDaewooAuto to assemble Korean-manufactured cars for export and domestic sale. Other large U.S. investors in Uzbekistan include Case IH, manufacturing and servicing cotton harvesters and tractors; Coca-Cola, with bottling plants in Tashkent, Namangan, and Samarkand; Texaco, producing lubricants for sale in the Uzbek market; and Baker Hughes, in oil and gas development.

In 2024, Uzbekistan's external debt reached $64.1 billion, or 55.7% of GDP, up from 51.9% in 2023. This included both public and private liabilities, though much of the private sector; particularly banks and industrial enterprises; remained state-owned. Government debt rose to $33.9 billion (29.5% of GDP), while corporate external debt reached $30.2 billion (26.2%). The government continued to control about 65% of the banking sector and held stakes in major firms like UzAuto Motors and Uzbekneftegaz. Public debt was projected to rise to $45.1 billion (36.7% of GDP) by the end of 2025.

In 2025, President Shavkat Mirziyoyev signed a law on Uzbekistan's accession to the Agreement Establishing the Eurasian Development Bank (EADB). Uzbekistan will become the seventh member of the Bank and the third largest shareholder with a 10% equity stake.

=== Controversy ===
According to the Organized Crime and Corruption Reporting Project (OCCRP), Vlast, and iStories, after February 24, 2022, Uzbekistan significantly increased its exports of cotton pulp and nitrocellulose, key components for making explosives and gunpowder, to Russia. According to Ekonomichna Pravda, at least two large Uzbek exporters have been working with Russian military-industrial complex enterprises. Documents from the Russian Federal Tax Service confirm that at least three Russian companies – Bina Group, Khimtrade, and Lenakhim - sold imported cotton pulp to military plants in Russia. Among them: Kazan Powder Plant (a strategic defense-industrial enterprise that produces gunpowder and charges for various types of weapons, subject to US sanctions), Tambov Powder Plant (a defense-industrial enterprise that produces ammunition and special chemicals, It is subject to US and Ukrainian sanctions), Perm Powder Plant (an enterprise involved in the production of Topol-M and Bulava intercontinental ballistic missiles, as well as Kornet ATGMs and Grad and Smerch multiple rocket launchers. It is under Ukrainian sanctions).

== Macro-economic data ==
The following table shows the main economic indicators in 1993–2024. Inflation below 5% is in green.

Year	GDP (in billion US$ PPP)	GDP per capita (in US$ PPP)	GDP (in billion US$ nominal)	GDP per capita (in US$ nominal)	GDP growth (real)	Inflation (in Percent)	Government debt (Percentage of GDP)
1993	▲46.6	▲2,133	▲6.9	▲316	▼ −2.3%	▲534.2%	n/a
1994	▼45.1	▼2,026	▲8.2	▲367	▼ −5.2%	▲1,568.3%	n/a
1995	▲45.7	▼2,013	▲12.7	▲562	▼ −0.9%	▲304.6%	n/a
1996	▲47.3	▲2,045	▲17.5	▲755	▲1.7%	▲54.0%	n/a
1997	▲50.6	▲2,121	▲18.4	▲772	▲5.2%	▲70.9%	▲15.3%
1998	▲53.4	▲2,203	▲18.7	▲773	▲4.3%	▲29.0%	▲18.0%
1999	▲56.5	▲2,297	▲21.4	▲869	▲4.3%	▲29.1%	▲18.4%
2000	▲59.9	▲2,448	▼17.2	▼702	▲3.8%	▲25.0%	▲29.5%
2001	▲63.9	▲2,574	▼14.6	▼588	▲4.2%	▲27.3%	▲44.8%
2002	▲67.4	▲2,686	▼12.1	▼482	▲4.0%	▲27.3%	▼41.6%
2003	▲71.7	▲2,819	▲12.7	▲499	▲4.2%	▲12.5%	▼31.4%
2004	▲79.0	▲3,075	▲15.0	▲585	▲7.4%	▲7.3%	▼26.9%
2005	▲87.2	▲3,352	▲17.9	▲689	▲7.0%	▲10.7%	▼21.0%
2006	▲96.7	▲3,674	▲21.3	▲811	▲7.5%	▲13.1%	▼13.5%
2007	▲108.7	▲4,077	▲28.0	▲1,049	▲9.5%	▲11.2%	▼9.6%
2008	▲120.8	▲4,461	▲35.9	▲1,325	▲9.0%	▲13.1%	▼8.3%
2009	▲131.4	▲4,771	▲41.9	▲1,523	▲8.1%	▲12.3%	▼7.3%
2010	▲142.4	▲5,085	▲49.8	▲1,777	▲7.1%	▲12.3%	▼6.6%
2011	▲156.3	▲5,366	▲60.2	▲2,068	▲7.5%	▲12.4%	▼6.3%
2012	▲170.5	▲5,768	▲67.5	▲2,285	▲7.1%	▲11.9%	▲6.8%
2013	▲186.0	▲6,203	▲73.2	▲2,440	▲7.3%	▲11.7%	▼6.2%
2014	▲202.3	▲6,634	▲80.8	▲2,651	▲6.9%	▲9.1%	▼6.1%
2015	▲218.9	▲7,056	▲85.7	▲2,761	▲7.2%	▲8.5%	▲10.0%
2016	▲234.1	▲7,414	85.7	▼2,713	▲5.9%	▲8.8%	▼8.2%
2017	▲248.8	▲7,745	▼69.7	▼2,170	▲4.4%	▲13.9%	▲17.3%
2018	▲263.2	▲8,058	▼58.7	▼1,797	▲5.6%	▲17.5%	▲17.5%
2019	▲281.7	▲8,469	▲67.3	▲2,024	▲6.8%	▲14.5%	▲25.4%
2020	▲283.9	▼8,372	▼66.4	▼1,960	▲1.6%	▲12.9%	▲33.7%
2021	▲316.7	▲9,163	▲77.3	▲2,238	▲8.0%	▲10.8%	▼31.7%
2022	▲359.6	▲10,196	▲90.1	▲2,555	▲6.0%	▲11.4%	▼30.5%
2023	▲396.0	▲10,992	▲101.6	▲2,820	▲6.3%	▲10.0%	▲32.5%
2024	▲428.2	▲11,596	▲112.7	▲3,051	▲5.6%	▲10.0%	▲34.3%
2025	▲471.9	▲12,596	▲127.2	▲3,355	▲6.3%	▲9.4%	▲35.4%

Household income or consumption by percentage share:

- Lowest 10%: 2.8%
- Highest 10%: 29.6% (2003)

Distribution of family income – Gini index: 36.8 (2003)

Agriculture – products: cotton, vegetables, fruits, grain; livestock

Industrial production growth rate: 6.2% (2003 est.)

Electricity:

- Production: 47.7 TWh (2002)
- Consumption: 46.66 TWh (2002)
- Exports: 4.5 TWh (2002)
- Imports: 6.8 TWh (2002)

Electricity – production by source:

- Fossil fuel: 88.2%
- Hydro: 11.8%
- Other: 0% (2001)
- Nuclear: 0%

Oil:

- Production: 143,300 barrels per day (22,780 m^{3}/d) (2004 est.)
- Consumption: 142,000 barrels per day (22,600 m^{3}/d) (2001 est.)
- Exports: NA
- Imports: NA
- Proved reserves: 297,000,000 barrels (47,200,000 m^{3}) (1 January 2002)

Natural gas:

- Production: 63.1 billion m^{3} (2001 est.)
- Consumption: 45.2 billion m^{3} (2001 est.)
- Exports: 17.9 billion m^{3} (2001 est.)
- Imports: 0 m^{3} (2001 est.)
- Proved reserves: 937.3 billion m^{3} (1 January 2002)

Current account balance: $3.045 billion (2007 est.)

Exports – commodities: cotton 17.2%, energy products 13.1%, metals 12.9%, machinery and equipment 10.1%, food products 7.9%, chemical products 5.6%, services 12.1%( 2006)

Imports – commodities: machinery and equipment 40.3%, chemical products 15.0%, metals 10.4%, food products 8.1%, energy products 4.3%, services 9.1% (2006)

Reserves of foreign exchange & gold: $5.6 billion (Dec. 2007 est.)

Exchange rates:

- UZS per USD – 1,865 (early 2012)
- UZS (s'om) per USD – 10,097 (Apr 2020)
- UZS per EUR – 2,900
- UZS per EUR – 10,981 (Apr 2020)

Current economy growth (6 months of 2009):

- GDP growth: +8,2%
- Volume of industrial production: +9.1%
- Volume of agricultural production: +4,6%

== See also ==
- List of companies of Uzbekistan
- Central Bank of Uzbekistan
- Corruption in Uzbekistan
- Federation of Trade Unions of Uzbekistan
- Ministry of Finance (Uzbekistan)
- Special economic zones of Uzbekistan
- Uzbekistan and the World Bank
- Economy of Central Asia
