= Uzbekistan and the World Bank =

Uzbekistan became a World Bank member in 1992, shortly after declaring independence in 1991 following the collapse of the Soviet Union. The World Bank has supported projects in Uzbekistan in the areas of education, infrastructure, agriculture, and water resource management. Uzbekistan's collaboration with the bank has been increasing, with IBRD and IDA lending reaching a recent peak of $500 million in 2015. The World Bank has provided financing for 27 projects through the IBRD and IDA in throughout its relationship with Uzbekistan, with 15 active projects as of June 2017. Current IBRD and IDA projects total $1.9 billion.

== World Bank Strategy in Uzbekistan ==
The Uzbekistan economy has been in a period of sustained economic growth since 2002, with GDP growing 7.8% in 2016. The World Bank attributes growth in 2016 to expansions in services, agriculture and the service sectors. Cotton is a major commodity comprising 14.2% of total exports in 2015, down from more than 20% in 2012.

The World Bank's Systematic Country Diagnostic report released in 2016 identifies 10 constraints that limit the economic potential of Uzbekistan. Among these are low accountability and regional inequality in the public sector, infrastructure bottlenecks, regulatory barriers, inefficient land allocation in the agricultural sector, limited access to pre-primary and tertiary education, and unsustainable use of natural resources. Taking into account the constraints listed in the SCD, the World Bank Country Partnership Framework for 2016–2020 highlights three Focus Areas to support the government's objective of achieving upper-middle income status by 2030. The focuses are private sector growth, agricultural competitiveness and cotton sector modernization, and public service delivery.

== Notable Completed Projects ==
=== Energy Infrastructure ===
The Talimarjan Transmission Project financed the construction of high voltage transmission lines in the southern Bukhara and Qashqadaryo regions of Uzbekistan and an open switch yard for the Talimarjan Thermal Power Plant. The project, closed on June 30, 2011, was designed to reduce transmission losses and improve service reliability for the region. Additionally, the project provided the increased transmission capacity necessary for two new combined cycle generators at the Talimarjan plant financed by the Asian Development Bank, JICA, and local investments. The project resulted in increased power reliability for 4 million people in the project area, with frequency of interruption down, electrical outages reduced from 92 to 24 hours per year, and voltage variation reduced to 5%.

=== Healthcare ===
A series of projects aimed at improving access and quality of rural healthcare have been supported by the World Bank in conjunction with the government of Uzbekistan. The First Health Project resulted in the establishment or rehabilitation of 682 primary care centers in rural Uzbekistan, with 673 receiving updated medical equipment. Ten month training courses in family medicine were provided to 898 doctors. The follow-up project, Second Health Project, resulted in upgraded equipment for 2,389 rural clinics and additional 10-month training courses for 3,770 general practitioners. Additionally, the project increased prenatal care coverage, newborn hepatitis B immunization, primary care utilization per capita, and essential drug stocks at the primary care level. The third project in the series, Health System Improvement Project, is currently underway with a greater emphasis on the larger district hospitals.

=== Education ===
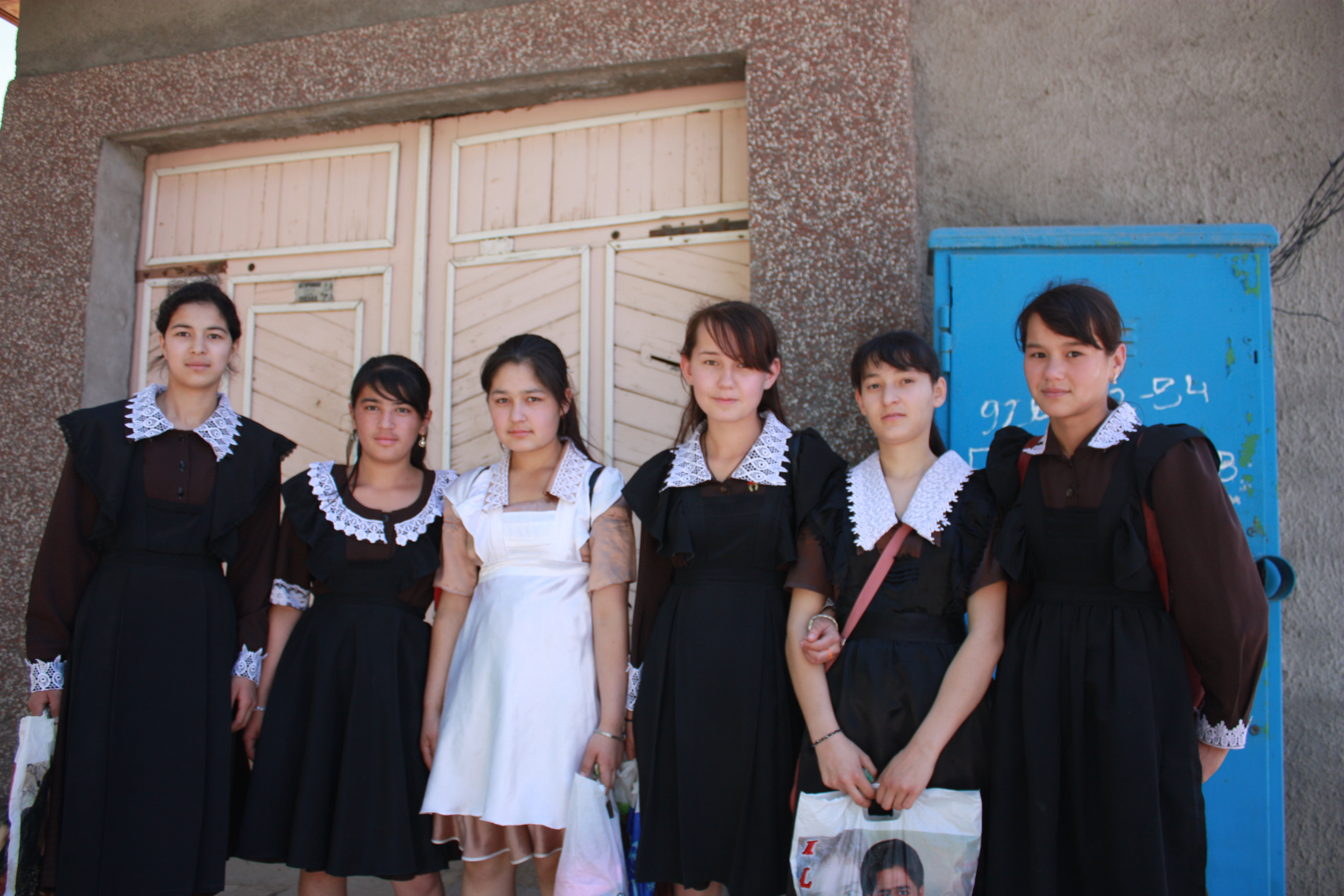
Students in Samarkand

The two phase Basic Education project aimed to improve the quality of general education in Uzbekistan by providing teachers with better materials, implementing standardized tests, and improving educational budget practices. Phase 1 targeted preschools and secondary education in 7 out of Uzbekistan's 12 oblasts. The project was completed in February 2011 and resulted in 80% of targeted schools receiving improved materials, effecting 1,501 secondary schools and 598 preschools. The project also provided training for 3,000 teachers, principals, and methodological in new teaching methods and software applications. A new financing formula for schools budgets was implemented with input from the Ministry of Public Education and the Ministry of Finance. Phase 2, completed in March 2014, continued the progress of phase 1 and expanded the targeted number of secondary schools to 2,198 from 1,501. Training was given to 59,147 teachers on student-centered teaching approaches. School improvement grants were administered to 500 school boards. The IEG ICR Review for the project determined that improvements to teaching were substantial due to the adoption of new materials and training while improvements to learning and student performance were modest based on standardized math and reading test scores from Grade 4 students. The Bank notes the difficulty in developing appropriate project timelines for education and how to accurately measure results for relatively short term projects.

== Controversy ==
=== Forced Labor in the Uzbekistan Cotton Harvest ===
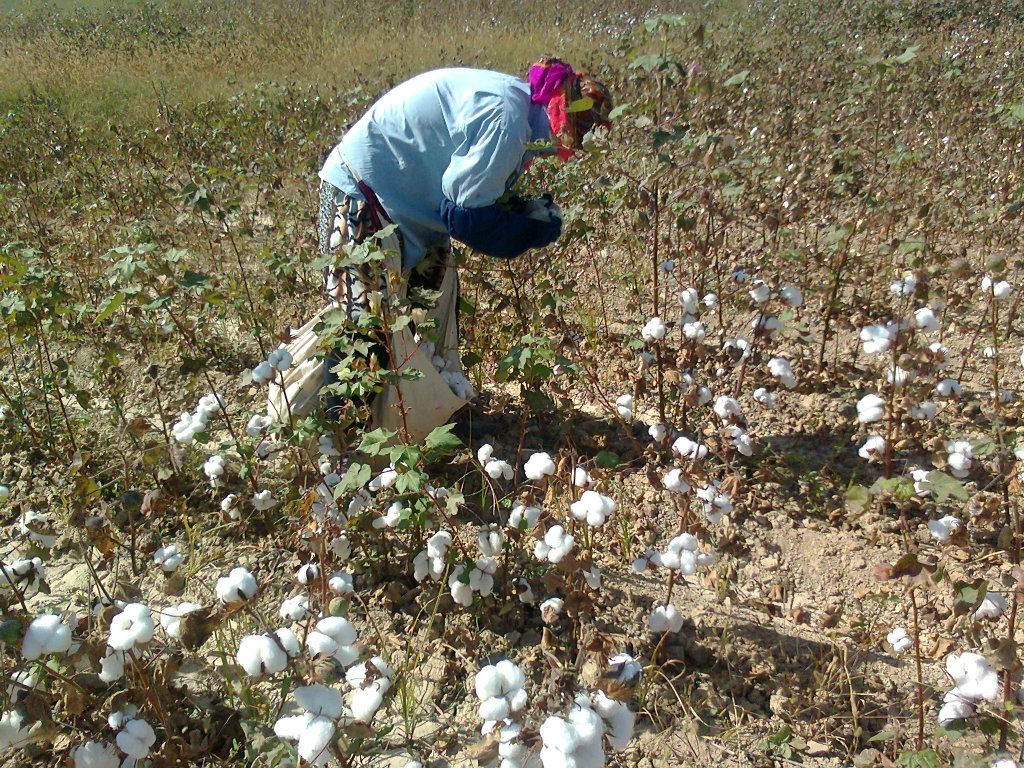
A laborer picking cotton in the Tashkent region of Uzbekistan.

The cotton industry is a major component of Uzbekistan's economy and remains in state control. Instances of the use of forced and child labor have been documented in the annual cotton harvest. A complaint was filed on June 30, 2016 against the IFC of the World Bank Group by an alleged forced laborer as well as three Uzbek human rights defenders. The complaint against IFC project number 36098 was filed anonymously in fear of retaliation. The complaint asserts that the IFC had not fulfilled its due diligence responsibilities in approving a loan in the amount of $40 million to Indorama Kokand Textile (IKT), a joint venture between the National Bank of Uzbekistan and Indorama Corporation. The loan was approved in spite of an IFC Environmental and Social Review Summary, referenced in the complaint, finding that the IKT had limited ability in ensuring that its supply chain remain free of forced labor. The IFC response to the complaint as well as the Environmental and Social Review Summary on IKT appear to be publicly unavailable, as references to IFC project 36098 have been removed from the IFC website.

The World Bank acknowledges the history of forced and child labor in Uzbek cotton and current projects aim to eliminate its use. The IFC project Sustainable Cotton Supply Chain Development in Uzbekistan aims to work with the government of Uzbekistan to establish a sustainable cotton production system. The new system is being developed in accordance with standards from the Better Cotton Initiative and will introduce market incentives to discourage the use of forced labor. The project began in February 2017 and is projected to run through December 2022.
