= Management Development Institute of Singapore in Tashkent =

Coordinates: 41.26941°N 69.2010°E

- Toshkentdagi Singapur Menejmentni Rivojlantirish Instituti
- Motto: Where lifelong learning begins
- Type: International branch
- Established: 5 September 2007
- Chairman: Khamidov Bakhtiyar Sultanovich
- President: Shodiyorkhon Abdivoyitov
- Rector: Dr Ilkhom Mamatkulov
- Director: Mr Chua Chen Hou
- Students: Over 5000
- Location: Tashkent, Uzbekistan
- Language: English
- Colors: Red, Black, Silver
- Website: mdis.uz

The Management Development Institute of Singapore in Tashkent (MDIST) is one of the first international university branches to open in Uzbekistan. It was established to meet the high demand for professionals in various fields. MDIS serves students of Uzbekistan and other CIS countries. It has trained more than 4,500 graduates.

== History ==
In January 2007 Uzbek President Islam Karimov was invited to Singapore by its president, S.R.Nathan, to discuss important international problems, and expand cooperation between two states. During his visit to Singapore, Karimov signed various documents which were aimed to deepen the two nations' cooperation in different spheres. One of the most important issues of the visit was discussion of education in Uzbekistan. The visit led to the establishment of MDIST on 5 September 2007, by Resolution of the President of the Republic of Uzbekistan, edict number PD-691.

Academic processes, subjects and textbooks are fully organized in accordance with the principles and standards of the Management Development Institute of Singapore, and by the educational standards of the Republic of Uzbekistan. MDIS Tashkent offers undergraduate and postgraduate programs, and they are recognized as documents of higher education in Uzbekistan, in Singapore, and in the rest of the world. Currently, there are more than 5,000 students at MDIS Tashkent, from different regions of Uzbekistan and many other countries of Central Asia, such as Afghanistan, Kyrgyzstan, Tajikistan and Kazakhstan. There are also students from Ukraine and South Korea. MDIS Tashkent has opened dormitories and hostels for these students.

In 2014, it was announced a new building is to be built in Tashkent starting from the end of 2015 and expected to be completed by the end of 2016.

== Founders ==
The MDIST is a joint venture educational establishment which offers international recognized degrees. It is currently owned by two institutions, which are the Management Development Institute of Singapore and Uzbekistan Banking Association. They own the 51% and 49% of the institute respectively.

== Partner Universities ==
The MDIST cooperates with three international universities – the University of Sunderland, Bangor University and Teesside University (United Kingdom). After finishing the Foundation Program, all MDIST students are asked to choose one of the partner universities to accomplish their undergraduate and postgraduate studies.

== Education structure ==
Education Structure of the MDIST consists of three different programs, which are the Foundation Program, Undergraduate Program, and Postgraduate Program.

=== Foundation Program ===
The Foundation Program is the first year of the studies and it is offered as a day program which could be completed in one year. The program consists of seven modules for two semesters. The first semester consists of three modules, and the second semester consists of four modules. The Foundation Program provides the students with structured program of studies which helps to improve their English language and communication skills. In addition, it gives a sound knowledge base in business studies, business concepts, encourages the development of a creative attitude, and motivates the participants to understand how the corporations and companies are managed.

=== Undergraduate Program ===
The Undergraduate Program is given only to the students who have successfully graduated from the Foundation Program. It lasts three years, and is provided by two different partner universities. However, the list of programs remains the same each year.

=== Postgraduate Program ===
The Postgraduate Program is provided under one qualification, which is Master of Business Administration (MBA). Therefore, the qualification is divided into five specializations, which are: Finance, Marketing, Hospitality Management, Supply Chain Management and Human Resource Management. The study duration for full-time students is 15 months, and consists of eight modules for MBA Finance, MBA Marketing, Supply Chain Management and Human Resource Management specializations. The MBA Hospitality Management specialization covers seven modules. To join the MBA programs, interested applicants must have finished an undergraduate program at any university.

== Campus ==
The MDIST's main campus and hostels are located in Tashkent city, Uzbekistan, Chilanzar district, Bunyodkor Avenue, house 28, 100185.

The main campus consists of classrooms, lecture halls, computer laboratories, a hospitality training center, tennis court, indoor swimming pool, volleyball court, football pitch, and gym. In all, the campus covers 5.2 hectares. It also has one of the biggest information resource centers among universities of Tashkent. Students can enter the information resource center at any time and make use of the resources. The center is equipped with computers and Internet access.

== Photo gallery ==
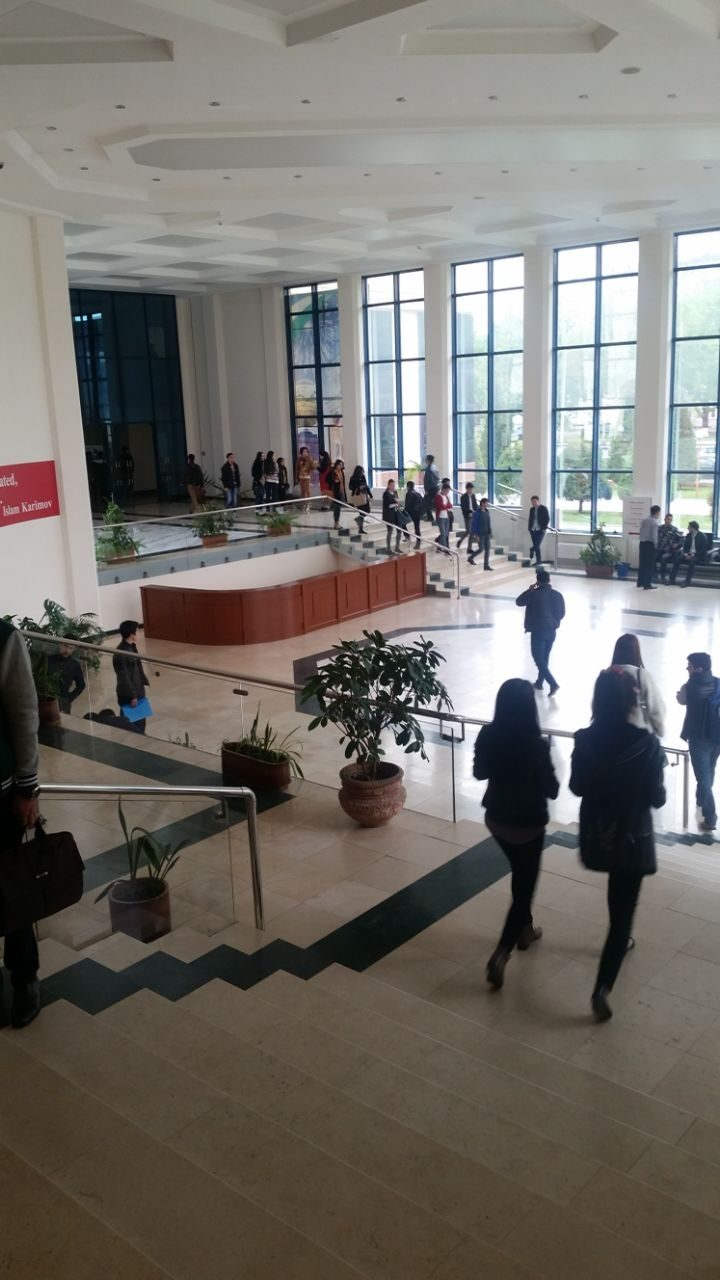

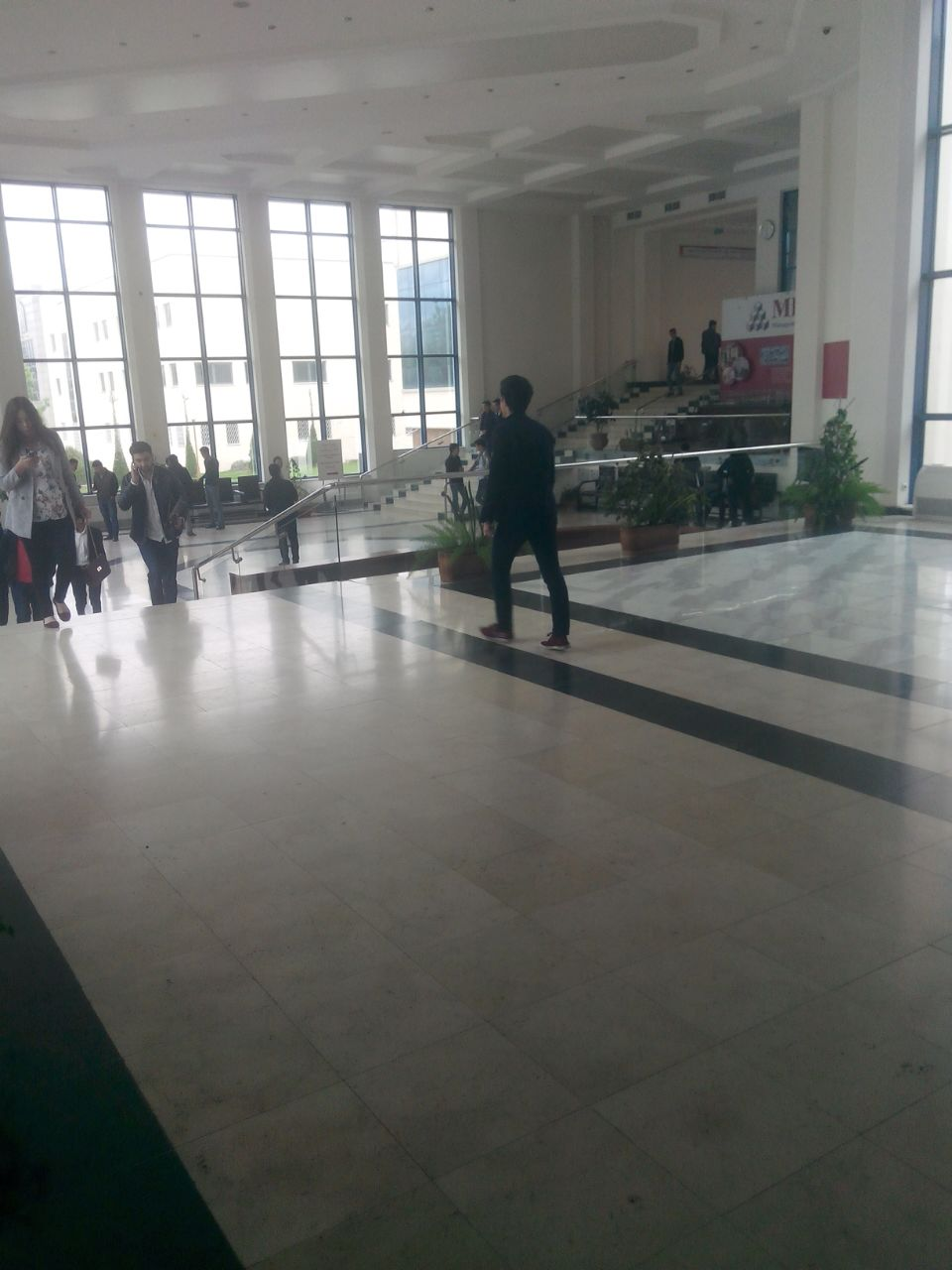
