= Timur Ishmetov =

Chairman of the Central Bank of Uzbekistan

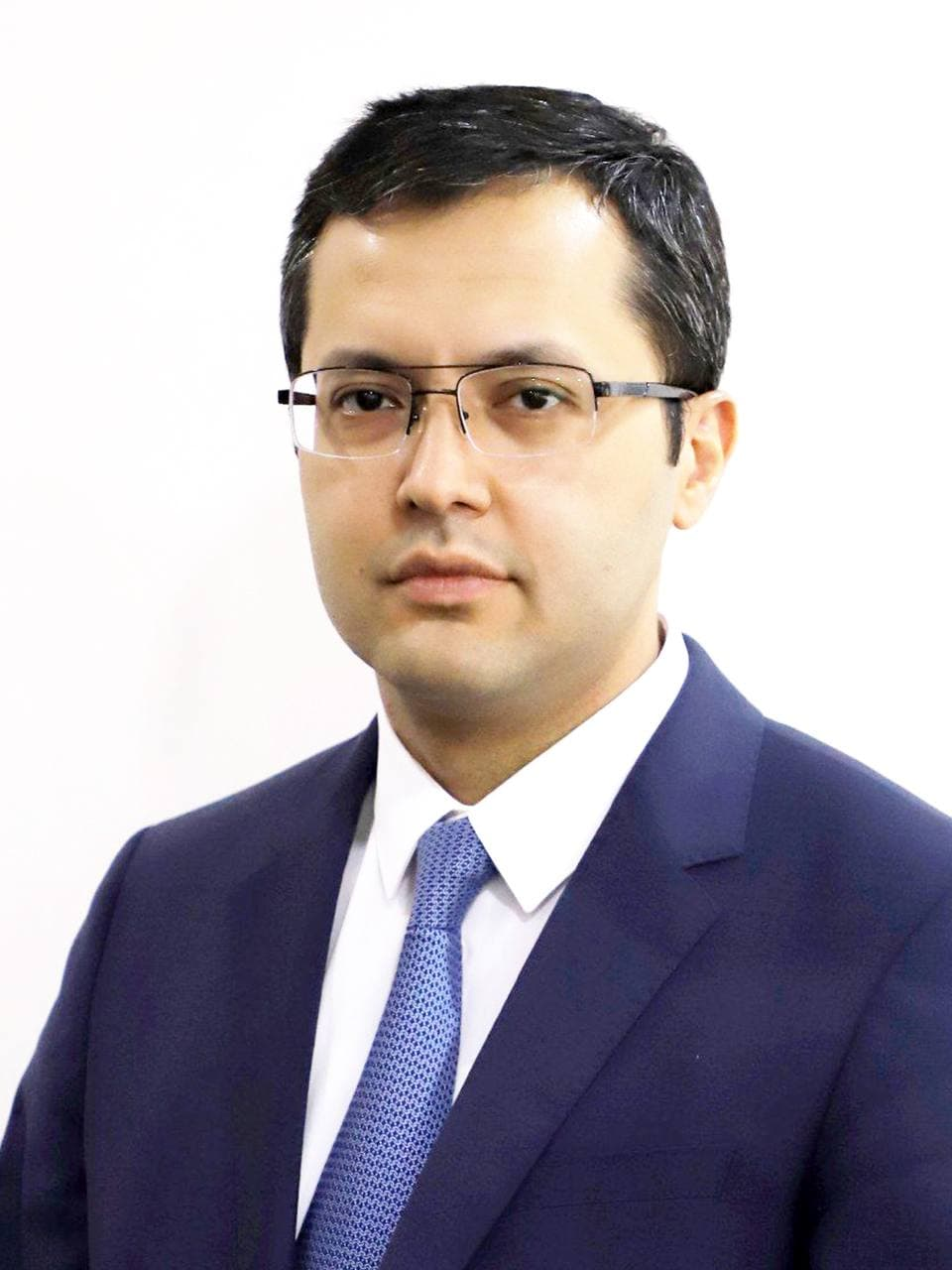
- Born: November 10, 1979 (age 46); Tashkent, Uzbekistan
- Education: Tashkent Institute of Finance, University of Birmingham
- Occupation: Banker
- Known for: Chairman of the Central Bank of Uzbekistan
- Awards: "Mehnat shuhrati" Order

Timur Amindjanovich Ishmetov (born 10 November 1979) is an Uzbek financier and statesman. He is serving as the Chairman of the Central Bank of the Republic of Uzbekistan.

He was Minister of Finance from 2020 to 2022. Since December 30, 2022, he has been working as First Deputy Advisor to the President on the Development of Economic Sectors, Implementation of Investment and Foreign Trade Policy.

== Early life and education ==
Timur Ishmetov was born on November 10, 1979, in Tashkent to an Uzbek family. His father, Ishmetov Aminjon Jabborovich, was the First Deputy Chairman of the Supreme Court of the Republic of Uzbekistan.

In 2000, he graduated from the Faculty of Finance and Credit of the Tashkent Financial Institute. And in 2005, he graduated from the Tashkent State Law Institute. In 2008, he graduated from the University of Birmingham, UK, with a master's degree in International Money and Banking.

== Career ==
Starting in early 2000s and until this day, Timur Amindjanovich Ishmetov has built a career on financing and banking spheres. He mostly spend his career years at the Central Bank of Uzbekistan.

From 2000 to 2001, he had worked as a leading economist of the Special Department of Currency Operations of the Central Bank of Uzbekistan. From 2001 to 2004, he worked as a Head of the Department of Currency Exchange and External Relations of the Central Bank of Uzbekistan.

Timur Ishmetov is considered as the initiator and one of the supporters of ″OpenBudget″ project
