= Uzbekistan Banking Association =

- Formation: 1995 in Tashkent
- Type: Professional association Advocacy group
- Location: (Uzbekistan) Tashkent
- Region served: Uzbekistan
- General Director: Abdullaev Saidullo Parxodbekovich
- Website: http://www.uba.uz/ru/

Uzbekistan Banking Association (UBA) is a voluntary trade association for commercial banks of the Republic of Uzbekistan. It is a noncommercial public organization, which fulfils the tasks of protecting the legitimate interests of banks. It ensures national commercial bank's conformity to the level of international standards with subsequent integration of banking sector in the world banking community.

The Uzbekistan Banking Association has 23 member banks, which represent over 90% of bank assets in the Republic of Uzbekistan. Uzbekistan Banking Association plays an essential role in economic and educational development of Uzbekistan. It has created the infrastructure which consists of 11 companies, which makes big contributions to the Uzbekistan economy.

In addition to this, Uzbekistan Banking Association is one of the owners of Management Development Institute of Singapore in Tashkent, which trains professionals in the economics of Uzbekistan. Uzbekistan Banking Association fully operates by the laws of Republic of Uzbekistan, by the Edicts, Decrees of the President of Republic of Uzbekistan, and by the Edicts which are made by Cabinet of Ministers of Republic of Uzbekistan.

== History ==
The Uzbekistan Banking Association was first established in July 1995, by edict of Presidents of the Republic of Uzbekistan Islam Karimov.

== Missions and objectives ==
Islam Karimov, President of the Republic Uzbekistan said "the mission of the Association of banks of Uzbekistan is a command of time. In present new conditions, the banking network gains the increasing value that connects all branches of economy and serves their development. Banks define stability, direction and pace of development of a national economy, its banks that create a basis of decent life of each citizen".

Uzbekistan Banking Association has set its own missions and objectives, which would lead to the development of banks and economy in Uzbekistan. The main missions and objectives of the Uzbekistan Banking Association are given as follows:

- Increase the roles of commercial banks in economy of Uzbekistan.
- Creation of the unique bank infrastructure, for the development of the bank systems in Uzbekistan, and raise the quality of the banks to the international standards.
- Cooperate for the self-development of commercial banks.
- Protect the rights and interests of Uzbekistan Banking Association members.
- Develop the reliability for the commercial banks among citizens.
- Creating the conditions for the capitalization of the banks.
- Activate the investment procedures at commercial banks.
- Develop the system of credit card usage in Uzbekistan.
- Developing the financial systems of banks

== General Director ==
Uzbekistan Banking Association is controlled by general director. The general director is elected by its members the commercial banks of Uzbekistan. Currently, the general director of Uzbekistan Banking Association is Abdullaev Saidullo Parxodbekovich.

== Location ==
Uzbekistan Banking Association's main building is located in Uzbekistan, Tashkent city, 100027, Chilanzar district, A.Xodjaeva street, house 1.

== See also ==
- Central Bank of Uzbekistan
- National Bank of Uzbekistan
