= Ministry of Finance (Uzbekistan) =

Government ministry of Uzbekistan

Ministry of Economy and Finance
- Iqtisodiyot va moliya vazirligi

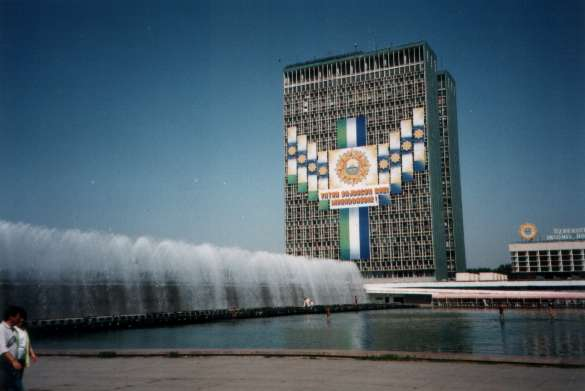

Taxation and budgeting agency overview
- Formed: February 11, 1992
- Preceding agencies: Ministry of Finance; Ministry of Macroeconomics and Statistics; Ministry of Economic Growth and Poverty Reduction
- Jurisdiction: Government of Uzbekistan
- Headquarters: Mustaqillik Maydoni, Tashkent
- Motto: Financial discipline is the guarantee of development.
- Minister responsible: Jamshid Qoʻchqorov, Minister of Economy and Finance
- Child agencies: State Committee on Taxation; State Planning Committee
- Website: imv.uz

The Ministry of Economy and Finance (Uzbek: Iqtisodiyot va moliya vazirligi) or Ministry of Finance, formed on February 11, 1992, is one of the most crucial government ministry available in the State, responsible for the formulation and implementation of unified state policy in the fields of macroeconomic development, public finance, budgeting, taxation, intergovernmental fiscal relations, public debt management, and state investment policy.

== History ==
=== Soviet era ===
The Ministry of Finance of the Uzbek SSR was established in 1924, shortly after the Uzbek Soviet Socialist Republic was created from the remnants of the Turkestan ASSR, Khorezm SSR, and Bukhara SSR. However, it was established as People's Commissariat of Finance with autonomous authority and commission.

It functioned as a republic-level branch of the USSR Ministry of Finance, operating under central directives but managing republican-level financial planning and control. With the outbreak of the Great Patriotic War in 1941, the Ministry of Finance of the Uzbek SSR assumed a critical wartime role, operating under both the Council of Ministers of the Uzbek SSR and directives from the USSR Ministry of Finance in Moscow. During the war, the Ministry radically restructured the republican budget, diverting substantial funds toward:

- Military manufacturing (including textile and machinery production);
- Maintenance and supply of evacuated factories from the western USSR;
- Civil defence infrastructure and air-raid preparedness.
- Capital expenditures were cut drastically; funds were reallocated to defense-related industries.
- Collaborated with the People’s Commissariat of Trade and Commissariat of Food Industry to implement food and goods rationing;
- Introduced and oversaw state ration cards, coupon systems, and material supply plans, especially for urban populations and key workers;
- Monitored local soviets and enterprises to prevent unauthorized spending and misuse of state funds;
- Uzbekistan hosted over 200 relocated enterprises and over 1 million evacuees (including skilled workers, scientists, and artists);
- Organized state loan campaigns (known as "war bonds") to finance the war;
- Encouraged citizens and enterprises in Uzbekistan to contribute to defense loans and patriotic funds;
- Handled accounting and repayment planning for “Goszaim” (state loan certificates) issued during the war years;
- Ensured price controls and monetary stability to prevent wartime inflation;
- Imposed strict financial audits and reporting from all public institutions;
- Reinforced disciplinary inspections to combat fraud, embezzlement, and unauthorized expenditures in wartime supply chains;

Post-war, it became heavily involved in reconstruction, particularly financing new collective farms (kolkhozes), industry, and social housing.

The Ministry worked closely with Gosplan UzSSR (State Planning Committee of the Uzbek Soviet Socialist Republic) to implement Five-Year Plans. It oversaw socialist accounting in enterprises and ensured that enterprises met their financial targets within the planned economy. While nominally a republican body, the ministry was subordinate to All-Union Ministry of Finance, and most fiscal decisions required central approval.

=== Post-Soviet era ===
Its presiding and merger organisations were:

- Minister of Finance and Forecasting (1987 - 1990);
- Minister of Finance (1991 - 2022);
- Minister of Macroeconomics and Statistics (1997 - 2004);
- Minister of Economy (2002 - 2018);
- Minister of Economy and Industry (2018 - 2020);
- Minister of Economic Development and Poverty Reduction (2020 - 2022);

== Ministers ==
Name	Took office	Left office	Notes
Erkin Boqiboyev	1991	1994	
Baxtiyor Hamidov	1994	1998	
Rustam Azimov	1998	2000	
Mamarizo Nurmurodov	2000	2004	
Saidahmad Rahimov	2004	2005	
Rustam Azimov	2005	2016	
Botir Xoʻjayev	2016	2017	
Jamshid Qoʻchqorov	2017	2020	
Timur Ishmetov	2020	2022	
Sherzod Qudbiyev	2022	2023	
Jamshid Qoʻchqorov	2023	Incumbent	

== See also ==
- Economy of Uzbekistan
- List of financial supervisory authorities by country
