= O'zelectroapparat-Electroshield =

O'zelektroapparat-Electroshield
- Company type: Public
- ISIN: UZ7025840008
- Industry: Energys
- Founded: 1941; 85 years ago
- Headquarters: Tashkent, Uzbekistan

O'zelektroapparat-Electroshield JSC (Russian: Узэлектроаппарат-Электрощит) is an Uzbekistani electric power equipment manufacturer. Since the company's inception in 1941, it has expanded its operation from manufacturing single products to manufacturing a range of electrical products, as well as design and installation of electrical equipment.

== History ==
O'zelektroapparat-Elektroshield JSC was originally Tashkent Electrotechnical Plant (TEZ), a daughter organization of NPO Sredazelektroapparat. TEZ was founded in 1941 in the former Soviet Union. The present name O'zelektroapparat-Elektroshield JSC was adopted in 2006.

In 2010, the company expanded the scale of its energy production due to an increase in heat and electric energy consumption in Uzbekistan.

In 2018, the company participated as an employer in an Uzbek-Chinese vocational training education program.

In December 2018, a fire broke out in an administrative building owned by the company. No one was injured.
