= Uzbek Industrial and Construction Bank =

Commercial bank in Uzbekistan

- Type: State-owned public company
- Traded as: (RSE : SQBN)
- ISIN: UZ7037560008
- Industry: Financial services
- Founded: October 28, 1922; 103 years ago
- Headquarters: Tashkent, Uzbekistan
- Area served: Uzbekistan
- Products: Banking services
- Owner: Government of Uzbekistan (60%-65%)
- Number of employees: 4,000 (2024)
- Website: sqb.uz

Uzbek Industrial and Construction Bank (SQB) is a Uzbekistan commercial bank, founded in 1922. It operates under License No. 17 of the Central Bank of the Republic of Uzbekistan, issued on December 25, 2021. Headquartered in Tashkent, the bank has a network of 79 branches and customer service offices, employing approximately 4,000 people. It serves over 1.5 million retail clients.

As of 1 January 2026, the Central Bank of Uzbekistan listed Uzpromstroybank third among the country's commercial banks by total assets. The state holds a majority stake (approximately 60–65%) in the bank's share capital, with preparations underway for privatization as part of a state program. The bank's ordinary shares are listed on the Tashkent Republican Stock Exchange (ticker: SQBN).

Originally focused on project financing for the oil and gas, energy, transport, and metallurgy sectors, SQB expanded its operations into retail banking and lending to small and medium-sized enterprises (SMEs) with advisory support from the International Finance Corporation (IFC) and the European Bank for Reconstruction and Development (EBRD). In December 2019, the bank issued US$300 million of 5.75% notes due in 2024.

== History ==
=== Foundation and Soviet period ===
- 1922: On October 28, the Central Asian office of the USSR Commercial and Industrial Bank (Prombank) was established in Tashkent to finance industry and trade.
- 1924: Following the formation of the Uzbek SSR, the bank became a republican institution acting as a government agent for financing sectors of the national economy.
- 1926: The bank financed early infrastructure projects, including the construction of the Bozsuv hydroelectric power station.
- 1932: In May, it was reorganized into Prombank, specializing in financing capital construction and industry.
- 1940–1960s: The institution provided financial support for industrial facilities during the war and post-war years.
- 1959: As part of the reorganization of the USSR banking system, the Industrial Bank was transformed into the All-Union Bank for Financing Capital Investments ("Stroybank of the USSR").
- 1966: The bank allocated financial aid and loans to restore buildings and infrastructure in Tashkent following the 1966 earthquake.
- 1987: Stroybank was transformed into the Industrial and Construction Bank (Promstroybank). Its functions expanded to provide settlement and cash services to enterprises and issue short-term loans.
- 1988: The bank participated in government economic programs.

=== Independence period ===
- 1991: Following the dissolution of the USSR, the Promstroybank branch network in Uzbekistan was nationalized. The institution was reorganized as the independent joint-stock commercial bank "Uzpromstroybank".
- Early 2000s: Financing was expanded for projects in the oil and gas and energy sectors.
- 2006: In January, the bank merged with the International Bank of Uzbekistan (Uzprivatbank).
- 2009: The institution officially changed its name to the Open Joint-Stock Commercial Bank "Uzbek Industrial and Construction Bank".
- 2011–2016: The bank continued project financing and implemented Basel regulatory reforms related to risk, liquidity, and capital management systems.

=== Modern transformation and digitalization ===
- 2018: The bank initiated structural changes and rebranded using the short name SQB, with advisory support from the International Finance Corporation (IFC).
- 2019: A Green Banking department was established. The bank issued $300 million in corporate eurobonds on the London Stock Exchange (LSE).
- 2020: An ESG policy was implemented, and the JOYDA digital retail platform was launched.
- 2021: The IFC provided a convertible loan of $75 million for SME and green project lending as part of pre-privatization preparations.
- 2022: The European Bank for Reconstruction and Development (EBRD) provided a $50 million convertible loan. The SQB Business remote service platform was launched.
- 2023: Eurobonds worth $100 million were issued via private placement to finance climate-related projects.
- 2024: Dual-currency Sustainability Bonds worth $400 million and 2.25 trillion UZS were issued on the London Stock Exchange. The JOYDA application was renamed SQB Mobile.
- 2025: A 30% state-owned stake was transferred to the National Investment Fund of Uzbekistan (UzNIF) ahead of a planned IPO. In October, $300 million in Additional Tier 1 (AT1) capital certificates were issued.

The bank issues international Visa Electron and Visa Classic payment cards.

== Ownership and management ==
=== Shareholder structure ===
As of 2024–2025, the shareholder structure of Uzpromstroybank is as follows:

- State share (Ministry of Economy and Finance of the Republic of Uzbekistan and the Fund for Reconstruction and Development of Uzbekistan) — approximately 60–65%.
- National Investment Fund of Uzbekistan (UzNIF) — 30% (transferred as part of pre-privatization preparations).
- Corporate shareholders (including Uztransgaz) — 2–5%.
- Free float — 3–7%.

The bank's securities are traded on the "Tashkent" Republican Stock Exchange: ordinary shares under the ticker SQBN, and preferred shares under the ticker SQBNP.

The bank is undergoing a pre-privatization process with the goal of reducing the state's share to below 49%. To support this transition, the bank secured convertible loans from the International Finance Corporation (IFC), the European Bank for Reconstruction and Development (EBRD), and the Asian Development Bank (ADB). UzNIF plans to conduct an initial public offering (IPO) of the bank's shares through a dual listing on the London Stock Exchange (LSE) and the Tashkent Stock Exchange.

=== Management ===
The bank's corporate governance structure consists of a Supervisory Board (strategic oversight) and a Management Board (operational management). Aziz Akbarjonov serves as the Chairman of the Management Board

== Financial indicators ==
Key financial indicators (in billions of UZS)

Year	Total assets	Loan portfolio	Equity	Net profit
2020	48 320	38 960	6 080	798
2021	55 731	42 537	8 100	856
2022	63 191	48 420	7 560	620
2023	73 293	58 008	8 439	856
2024	84 800	66 475	9 352	1 115
2025 (H1)	94 767	70 060	10 022	661
