= Makro (Uzbekistan) =

Uzbek supermarket chain

Darvoza Savdo LLC

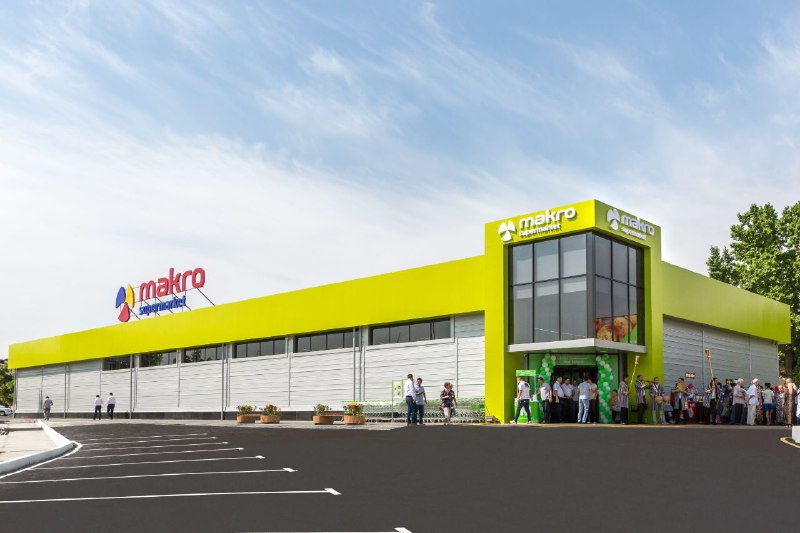
- Trade name: Trading as Makro
- Founded: 2010; 16 years ago in Tashkent, Uzbekistan
- Number of locations: 108 stores (2021)
- Key people: Roman Sayfulin (CEO)
- Number of employees: 3,500
- Website: makromarket.uz

Makro is an Uzbek supermarket chain headquartered in Tashkent. The company operates a network of 108 stores across 25 urban areas in Uzbekistan, making it the country's largest food retailer by store count. The company has 3,500 employees. Makro claims to command 20% of market share in Tashkent and around 5% of market share nationally. The company's main competitors are Korzinka.uz, another local supermarket chain, and foreign retailers that have recently entered the Uzbek market, including French multinational player Carrefour, and Kazakh company Magnum. Around 20% of Makro's merchandise is the chain's in-house brand, called “M,” while 53% of merchandise is produced in Uzbekistan. In July 2021, Retail Asia Awards announced Makro won the 2021 Domestic Retailer of the Year and Convenience Store of the Year for Uzbekistan. Makro is owned by the Orient Group of companies. In June 2022, the CEO Roman left the Group to pursue his own projects.

== History ==
Makro was founded on December 11, 2010. In 2016, the company acquired Sunday, a local competitor that operated 26 stores. In May 2020, Makro became the first supermarket chain in Uzbekistan to install self-checkout kiosks. In October 2020, the company became the first retailer in Uzbekistan to install electric vehicle charging stations at select locations. On December 11, 2020, Makro opened 10 stores in one day to mark the company's 10-year anniversary. In February 2021, the company announced that it would install a network of 30 electric vehicles charging stations at stores in Tashkent and 10 other cities. On May 13, 2021, Makro announced that it has partnered with accounting firm Ernst & Young to audit the company's financials and help implement its transition to International Financial Reporting Standards (IFRS) accounting. In July 2021, Makro was named "Convenience Store of the Year" and "Domestic Retailer of the Year" in Uzbekistan at the Retail Asia Awards.

== Stores ==
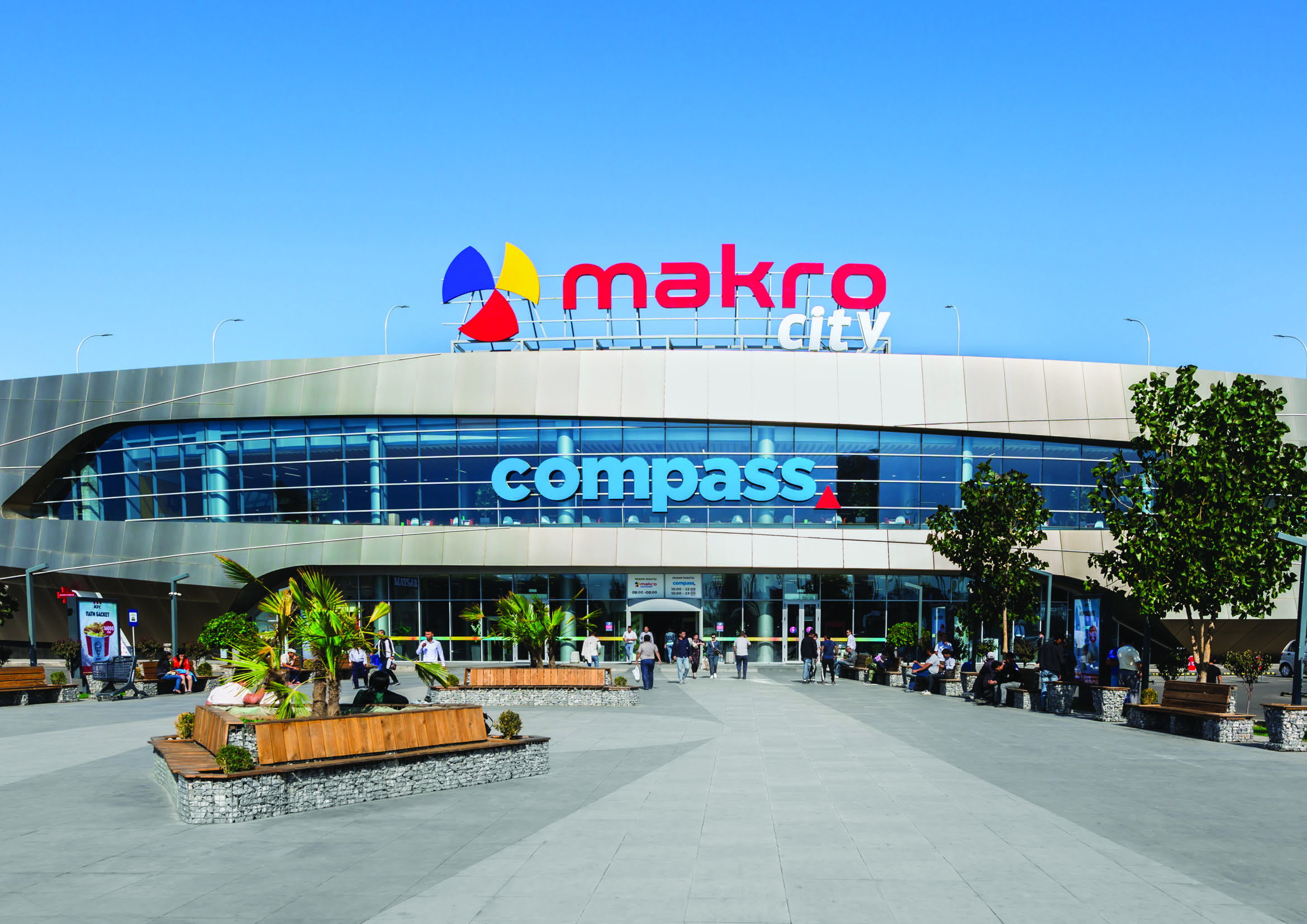
Makro City

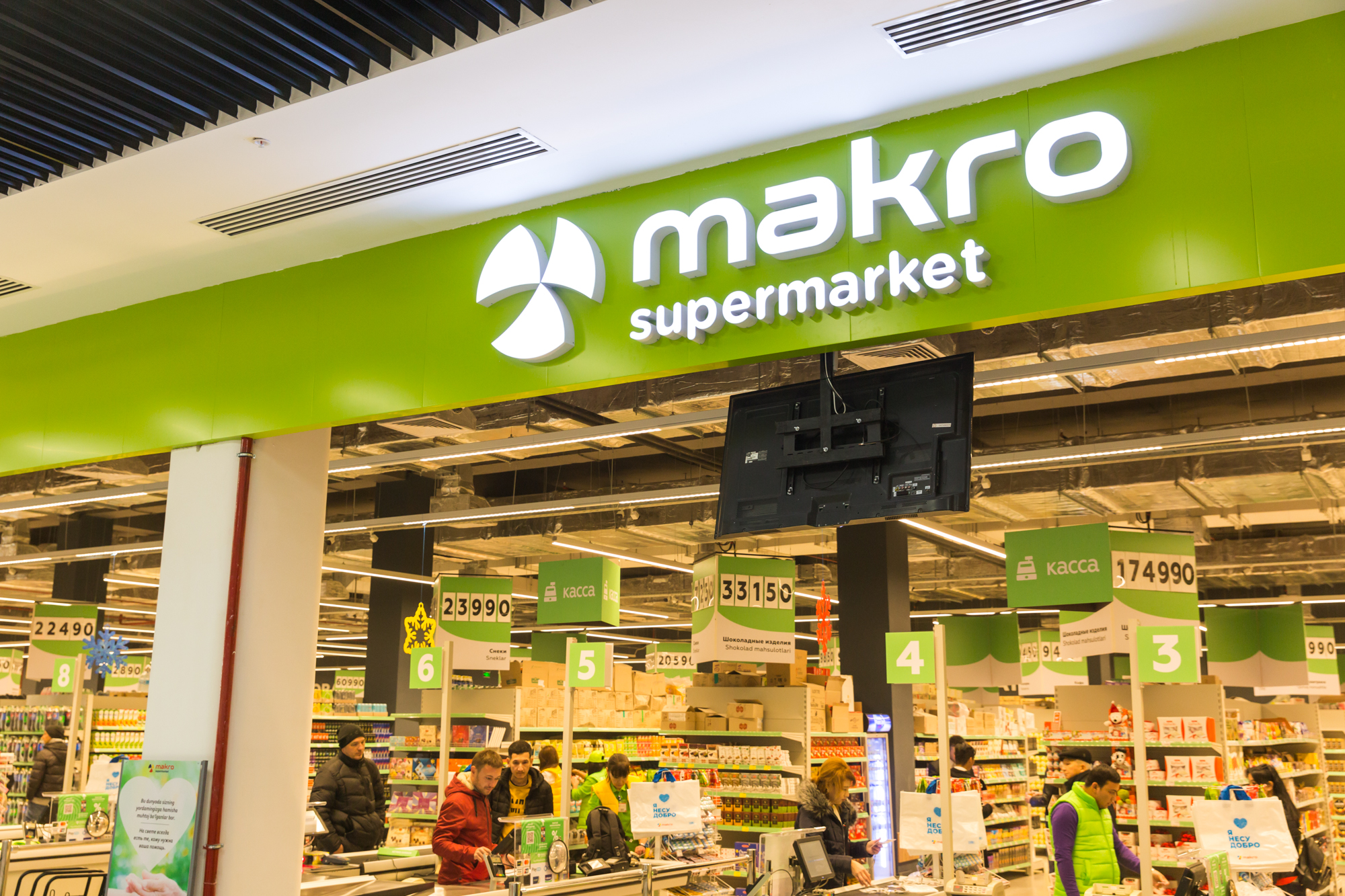
Makro Supermarket

Makro has three store formats:

Makro City
Makro City are hypermarkets with a trading area of over 2,000 square meters. These stores are distinguished by a wider range of merchandise and counters selling prepared foods.
Makro Supermarket
Makro Supermarkets are standard format supermarkets with a trading area of between 600 and 1200 square meters.
Makro Express 24
Makro Express are convenience stores with a trading area of less than 600 square meters.

== Makro in social media ==
- Official website
- Makro on LinkedIn
