= Federation of Trade Unions of Uzbekistan =

- Federation of Trade Unions of Uzbekistan
- Headquarters: Tashkent, Uzbekistan
- Location: Uzbekistan
- Key people: Dilbar Djikhangirova, president
- Affiliations: GCTU

The Federation of Trade Unions of Uzbekistan (FTUU), also known as the Trade Unions Federation of Uzbekistan (TUFU) is the sole national trade union center in Uzbekistan. It is the remnant of the previous Soviet trade union system, although it has lost some of its previous powers, such as state planning and enterprise management.

The FTUU is affiliated with the General Confederation of Trade Unions.
