= Central Bank of Uzbekistan =

National bank of Uzbekistan

Coordinates: 41°18′31″N 69°16′28″E

Central Bank of Uzbekistan Oʻzbekiston Respublikasi Markaziy banki

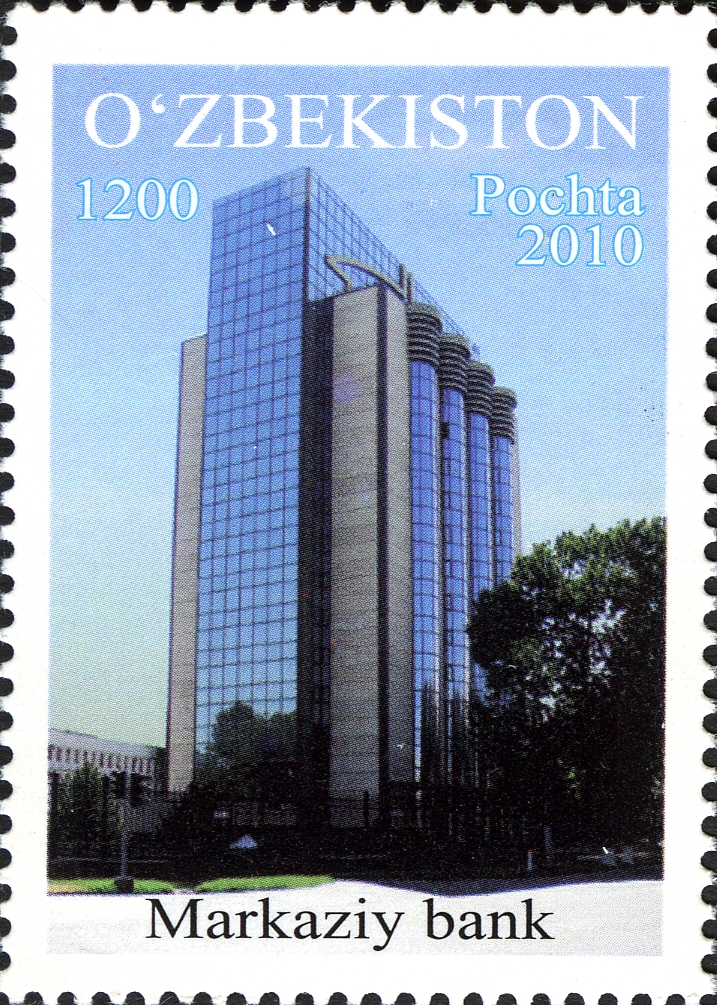
- Central bank of: Uzbekistan
- Headquarters: Tashkent
- Established: 1991
- Ownership: 100% state ownership
- Governor: Timur Ishmetov
- Currency: Uzbek sum (UZS); UZS (ISO 4217)
- Reserves: $75.08 billion (February 1, 2026)
- Website: cbu.uz

The Central Bank of Uzbekistan, officially the Central Bank of the Republic of Uzbekistan. (Uzbek: O'zbekiston Respublikasi Markaziy banki / Ўзбекистон Республикаси Марказий Банки), is the country's national bank. The current chairman of the central bank is Timur Ishmetov.

== Structure ==
The Central Bank of the Republic of Uzbekistan represents a centralized control system. For the performance of assigned tasks it creates the appropriate services and establishments, which work on the basis of rules confirmed by the Board of the Central Bank.

The structure and bodies of management of the Central Bank are determined by the Law “On the Central Bank”. The supreme body of the Central Bank is the Board of the Central Bank. The Board consists of 11 members and is headed by the Chairman who is, at the same time, Chairman of the Central Bank. The Board of the Central Bank is allocated large powers by definition and regulation of the basic directions of monetary policy and development of the banking system.

== Cooperation with international financial organizations ==
There is integration of the Republic of Uzbekistan and its Central Bank in the world community. The Central Bank maintains Mutual cooperation with:

- International Monetary Fund (IMF)
- World Bank
- European Bank for Reconstruction and Development
- Asian Development Bank

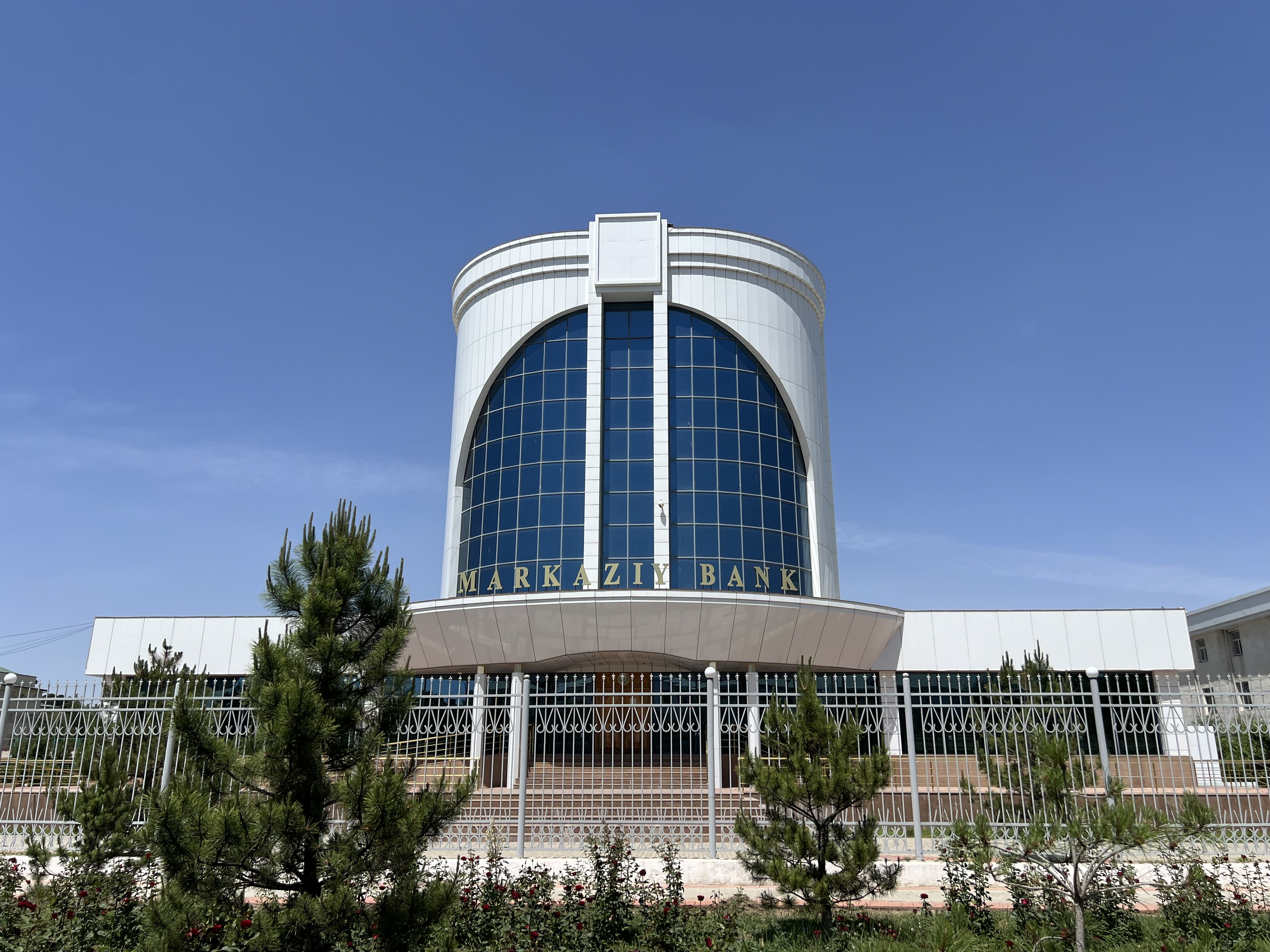
Kashkadarya Regional branch of Central Bank Uzbekistan

The international cooperation has allowed the bank to begin realization of the received credits on transformation system, maintenance of balance of payments, financing of private business, institutional and rehabilitation loans, and others.

There is a special working group, including an IMF representative, which is in charge of implementing further liberalization of the exchange market. The basic task of the working group is the creation of conditions, and development of a strategy, for maintenance of the convertibility of the Uzbek soum on the current international operations.

The positive results of work with the international financial organizations opens new prospects for the realization of joint projects together with various economic institutes and large banks of the world.

== Exchange policy of the Central Bank ==
The main purpose of transition, in the transition period from planned economy to market mechanism, is stabilization and structural transformation. An ultimate goal is the improvement of economic growth, full employment, price stability and sustainability of the balance of payments.

After getting independence, Uzbekistan has faced a few difficulties about the realization of macroeconomic reforms to overcome inflationary processes and a decline in manufacturing to create adequate conditions for the financial system.

== Functions ==
"The Central Bank of the Republic of Uzbekistan is the state issuing and reserve bank. The Central Bank is authorized by the Constitution of the Republic of Uzbekistan. The Central Bank cooperates with national and Central Banks of other states on the basis of intergovernmental and interbank agreements. The Central Bank of the Republic of Uzbekistan has 14 regional branches, functioning in regions of the country."

The Central Bank is the depository of the international financial organizations. The Central Bank is accountable to the Supreme Council of the Republic of Uzbekistan and independent of the executive bodies.

The basic functions of the Central bank are development and realization of economic policy of the state in the field of money circulation, crediting, financing, accounting, exchange relations, monetary system management of the Republic of Uzbekistan.

The task of maintenance of money circulation stability and solvency of money in the territory of the republic is performed by the Central Bank by management of money turnover, regulation structure of money supply. The Central Bank issues money to circulation and conducts forecasting of money turnover.

In 2020 the bank launched the website Finlit.uz, an information-educational resource to promote financial literacy.

== Chairmen ==
- Fauzulla Mulladzhanov, 1991–2017
- Mamarizo Nurmuratov, 2017-2024
- Timur Ishmetov, since 11.12.2024

== Numismatic collection ==
As part of its role in managing the monetary supply of Uzbekistan the National Bank has established a collection of coins from the region over the past two and half thousand years. The collection has been published in four volumes (1997, 2000, 2000, 2001), a total of 400 coins and covers the whole history of Central Asia but with a focus on the Islamic period.

== See also ==
- Economy of Uzbekistan
- Uzbek soum
- List of central banks
