= Gayane Umerova =

Uzbek art critic (born 1985)

Gayane Olegovna Umerova
- Гаянэ Олеговна Умерова
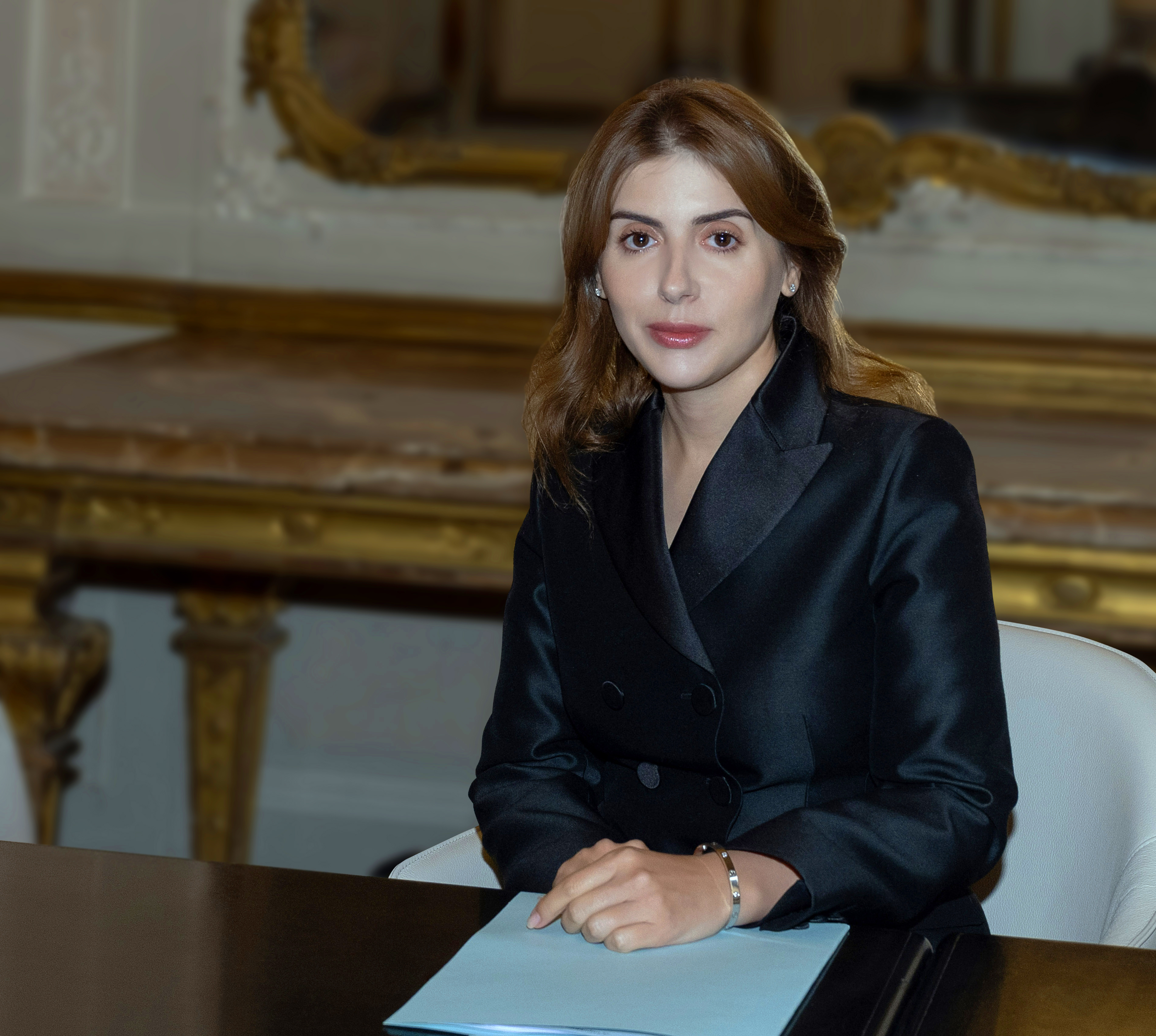
- Born: Gayane Olegovna Umerova; April 22, 1985 (age 41); Tashkent, Uzbek Soviet Socialist Republic
- Education: Westminster International University in Tashkent (B.A., 2008); Central Saint Martins (2009); Sotheby's Institute of Art (2011); University of Manchester (M.A., 2012)
- Occupations: art critic, art curator
- Years active: 2008–present
- Employer(s): Uzbekistan Art and Culture Development Foundation
- Organization: Department of Politics and International Relations, University of Oxford

Gayane Olegovna Umerova (born 22 April 1985, Tashkent, UzSSR, now Republic of Uzbekistan) is a curator and public figure in the field of culture in Uzbekistan.

She is the Head of the Department of Creative Economy and Tourism of the Administration of the President of the Republic of Uzbekistan, Chairperson of the Uzbekistan Art and Culture Development Foundation (ACDF), and Chairperson of the National Commission of Uzbekistan for UNESCO Affairs under the Cabinet of Ministers (since 2020). In these positions, Umerova has played a key role in promoting Uzbek historical and contemporary art internationally.

== Early life and education ==
Umerova developed an early interest in the arts, supported by her family and education.

In 2004, Umerova graduated from the School of Integrated Arts in West Yorkshire, and in 2008, she earned a BA in Business Management from Westminster International University. She later completed a degree in "Culture, criticism and curation" at Central Saint Martins College of Arts in 2009.

She also holds an MA in Contemporary Arts and Art Business from Sotheby's Institute of Art (2011) and the University of Manchester (2012). Since 2017, she has been a researcher at the Department of Politics and International Relations, University of Oxford (UK), in cultural diplomacy, foreign cultural policy.

Since 2017, she has been a researcher at the Department of Politics and International Relations at the University of Oxford, focusing on cultural diplomacy and foreign cultural policy.

== Career ==
=== Early projects ===
From 2008 to 2017, Umerova worked as a leading specialist in the Department of Exhibitions and Funds at the Fine Arts Gallery of Uzbekistan, curating several notable exhibitions including Gerhard Richter (2008), Günther Uecker (2009), Oganes Tatevosyan (2012), and the Tashkent International Contemporary Arts Biennale in 2009 and 2011.

She consulted for Sotheby's on the "At the Crossroads: Contemporary Art from Caucasus and Central Asia" exhibition series in 2013–2014 in London. In collaboration with Christie's, Umerova helped organise the first auction of contemporary Uzbek art at the Savitsky Museum in Nukus. In 2015, she curated "Henry Moore: Master of Graphics" exhibition at the Museum of Arts of Uzbekistan in cooperation with the British Council, followed by "The New Past: British Contemporary Arts" in 2016.

=== Uzbekistan Art and Culture Development Foundation ===
Since 2017, Umerova has worked at the Uzbekistan Art and Culture Development Foundation (ACDF), initially as head of the budget management department, becoming Deputy Executive Director in November 2017 and executive director in 2020. The foundation aims to advance Uzbekistan's cultural processes and strengthen its international presence. Umerova is responsible for protecting cultural heritage, museum collections, covering historical and cultural areas of Uzbekistan included in the World Heritage List.

She curated Uzbekistan's first national pavilion at the 17th Venice Architecture Biennale in 2021, titled "Mahalla: Urban Rural Living" and commissioned "Unbuild Together" at the 18th Venice Architecture Biennale in 2023. She is the commissioner of the Uzbekistan National Pavilion at the Venice Biennale, present in 2022 at the 59th Venice Biennale with the exhibition "Dixit Algorizmi: The Garden of Knowledge", "Don't Miss The Cue", at the 60th Venice Biennale in 2024 and "The Aural Sea" in 2026.

Under her leadership, Uzbekistan's cultural heritage was presented in exhibitions such as "The Splendours of Uzbekistan's Oases" at the Louvre (2022–2023), and "On the Roads to Samarkand: Wonders of Silk and Gold" at the Arab World Institute in Paris (2022–2023). She also oversaw exhibitions in Berlin's Neues Museum & James-Simon-Galerie on Uzbekistan's archaeological finds in southeastern Uzbekistan, including artefacts from the Kushan Empire.

In 2019, Umerova directed the first international charity race in Uzbekistan, the Samarkand Half Marathon, to raise awareness of accessibility for people with disabilities. This led to the creation of Uzbekistan's first tactile exhibition for visually impaired visitors. Umerova also implemented educational programmes with Reacomp to train cultural specialists, introduced theatre performances with audio descriptions in 2020, and initiated legal and grant programs to improve accessibility in museums.

Umerova has overseen large-scale architectural projects such as the construction of a new State Museum of Arts of Uzbekistan designed by Pritzker Prize laureate Tadao Ando and the creation of the Centre for Contemporary Art in Tashkent with the Mahalla artist residencies (MAH) in collaboration with architecture bureau Studio KO. She also managed the opening of the French Cultural Center, the reconstruction of the Romanov Palace in Tashkent and the State Children's Library.

In 2024, Umerova organised the Uzbek avant-garde movement exhibitions at the Uffizi Gallery and Ca' Foscari, curated the "Craft of Uzbekistan: Traditions in Threads" exhibition for the Doha Design Biennial, and opened the "Silk Roads" exhibition at The British Museum. She brought to Uzbekistan the 2024 World Conference on Creative Economy (WCCE), which for the first time since its inception took place in Tashkent.

Umerova is overseeing her home country's participation in Expo Osaka 2025, with Atelier Brückner designing the Uzbekistan Pavilion. The pavilion's theme, "How to live in the future and how to be happy," reflects Uzbekistan's approach to innovation and its vision of empowering people for the future.

She is the commissioner of the inaugural Bukhara Biennial, titled "Recipes for Broken Hearts", which will take place in September 2025 in Bukhara, a UNESCO Creative City of Crafts. The event will feature artistic disciplines from around the world, including works created specifically in Uzbekistan.

== Awards and recognitions ==
- 2013: Prize of the Union of Artists of the Artistic Confederation of the CIS countries for the project 'Observations on the Invisible World', which explores the Islamic ornamental system in the art of Central Asia.
- 2016: Included by the English‑language portal 'The Culture Trip' on its list of '8 Most Influential Women in Central Asian and Caucasian Art'.
- 2022: Included in Cosmopolitan Russia's list of 30 influential women from the CIS countries in the media.
- 2025: Officer of the Order of Arts and Letters (France).
- 2025: Order of Friendship (Uzbekistan).
- (Date unknown): Awarded a commemorative badge on the occasion of the 30th anniversary of the Republic of Uzbekistan.

== Personal life ==
Gayane Umerova is married and has three daughters.
