= Westminster International University in Tashkent =

International university in Tashkent, Uzbekistan

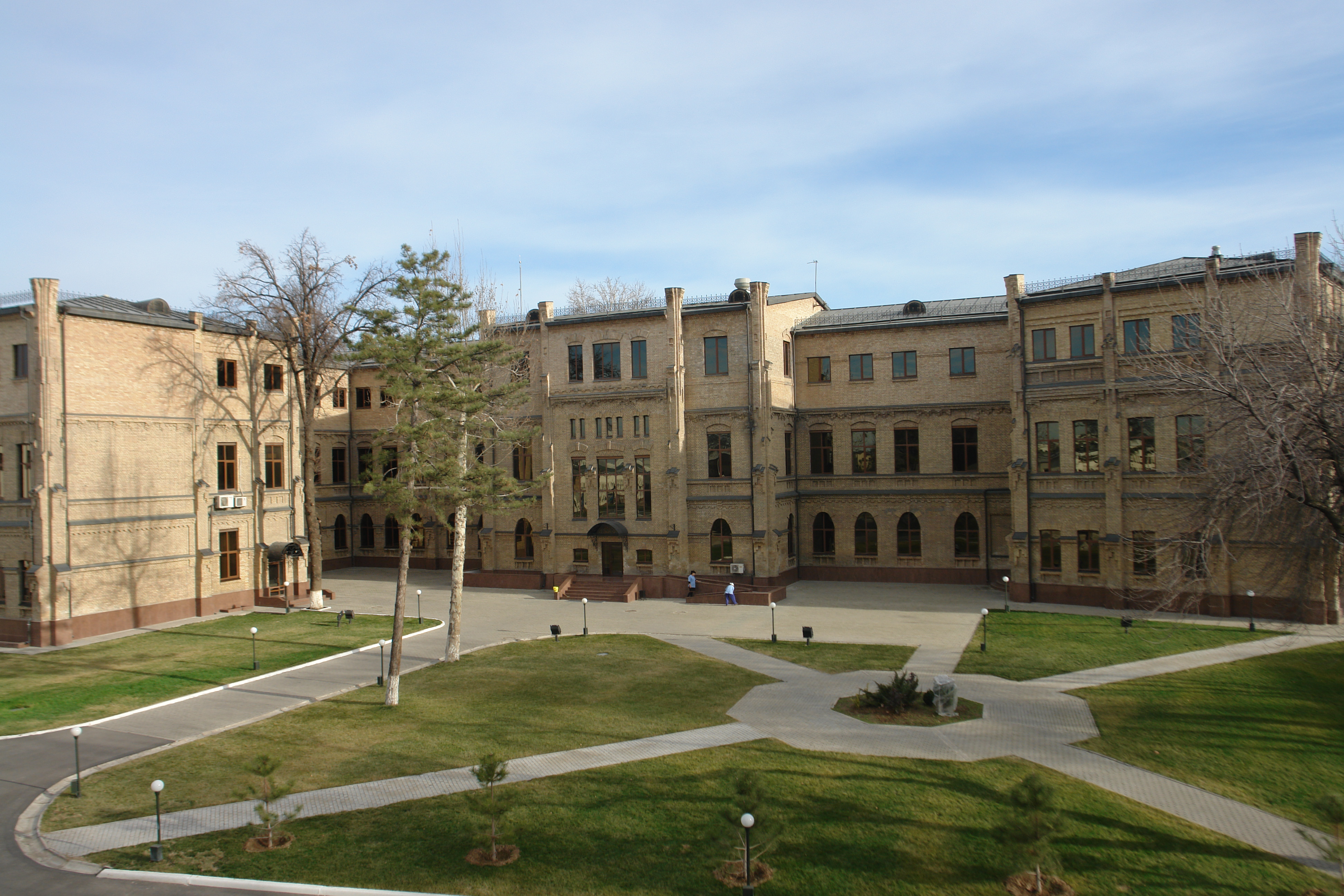
- WIUT main building in 2015
- Type: International university
- Established: January 2002; 24 years ago
- Founders: Umid Foundation; University of Westminster
- Rector: Komiljon Karimov
- Total staff: 485 (2024/25)
- Students: 7,860 (2025/26)
- Undergraduates: 6,811 (2025/26)
- Postgraduates: 1,049 (2025/26)
- Location: 12 Istiqbol Street, Tashkent, 100047, Uzbekistan; 41.3069°N 69.2833°E
- Campus: Urban
- Language: English
- Colors: Blue
- Nickname: WIUT Wolves
- Mascot: WIUT Wolf
- Website: www.wiut.uz

Westminster International University in Tashkent (Uzbek: Toshkent xalqaro Vestminster universiteti; WIUT) is an international university in Tashkent, Uzbekistan. Founded in January 2002 by the Umid Foundation, the Ministry of Higher and Secondary Specialised Education of Uzbekistan, and the University of Westminster, it is the first international institution of higher education in Uzbekistan.

Following a resolution by Uzbekistan's Cabinet of Ministers, the Tashkent Aviation College building, originally built in 1912, was transferred to WIUT. The university admitted its first students in 2002, enrolling 120 students.

WIUT is organised into three schools and one affiliated academic lyceum—the Academic Lyceum of Westminster International University in Tashkent (ALWIUT). The university has been described in International Education: An Encyclopedia of Contemporary Issues and Systems as 'successful in attracting students with high academic credentials'.

== History ==
In 2001, the Umid Foundation, established in 1997 by the Uzbekistani government to fund scholarships for Uzbekistani students to study abroad, proposed to the British Council that it fund a British-style university based in Tashkent, one that would replace its scholarship scheme with a locally based alternative. In September 2001, the University of Westminster, one of three shortlisted higher education institutions in the United Kingdom, won the bid. The project was costed at £12.5 million and funded entirely by the Umid Foundation..

The University of Westminster's vice-chancellor, Geoffrey Copland, described his reaction to the proposal:

I thought this was really interesting. How do you build a nation from nothing? […] Interestingly it was a Presidential initiative and it intrigued me. Karimov had identified the only way forward for his country was to reduce its ties to Russia and to build something which was completely new, use English as a teaching medium, and would be independent of the administration and thereby free from all the corruption and bribery and everything else that was going on.

WIUT was founded in 2002 by the Umid Foundation, the Ministry of Higher and Secondary Specialized Education of Uzbekistan, and the University of Westminster. Its first rector, Abdujabbor Abduvohidov, took office the same year. The first classes began in September 2002, with 120 students. The formal opening ceremony was held in May 2003, at which British prime minister Tony Blair sent a letter to Uzbekistani president Islam Karimov congratulating him on the project.

The Tashkent Aviation College building was transferred to WIUT. The building was originally constructed in 1912, to designs by architect Georgiy Svarichevsky, as the Second Girls' Gymnasium, after the First Girls' Gymnasium could no longer accommodate all its students. It later housed the Turkestan People's University and the Central Asian Economic Planning Institute, before becoming the Tashkent Aviation College.

In 2006, WIUT received $3.5 million a year from the Uzbekistani government.

According to diplomatic cable sent by United States Ambassador to Uzbekistan Jon Purnell to Washington, D.C. in 2006, several senior WIUT staff members were officers of Uzbekistan's National Security Service, including then-rector Abdujabbor Abduvohidov, who had previously served as the National Security Service's head for the region in which the 2005 Andijan massacre took place. In 2013, the University of Westminster denied the known connection between Abduvohidov and Uzbekistan's National Security Service. Alan France, the university's first deputy rector, acknowledged, "It's no secret that Abdujabar [sic] had a past."

== Administration and organization ==
WIUT has three schools (the WIUT Business School, the School of Law, Technology & Education, and the Graduate School).

=== Rector ===
The university's formal head is the rector. The rector is appointed by Uzbekistan's Cabinet of Ministers.

The following persons served as the rector of WIUT:

No.	Name	Term starts	Term ends	Refs.
1	Abdujabbor Abduvohidov	2002	2011	
2	Abdumalik Djumanov	2011	2015	
3	Komiljon Karimov	2015	2020	
4	Bahrom Mirqosimov	2020	2024	
5	Komiljon Karimov	2024	present	

== Academics ==
WIUT offers pre-foundation, foundation, undergraduate, and postgraduate programs, all validated by the University of Westminster. The majority of students at the university study economics or business subjects.

WIUT is organized into several schools, including Business & Economics, and Law, Technology, & Education. These schools are further divided into smaller academic departments focusing on specific subject areas.

WIUT is only university in Uzbekistan and Central Asia which offers English Law Degree. WIUT Law degree is qualifying Law degree in Uzbekistan.

=== Teaching and learning ===
WIUT follows a semester system, with the first semester usually beginning in September and the second semester ending in mid-June.

=== International partnerships ===
WIUT students can study abroad for a semester at partner institutions such as Free University of Berlin, University of Westminster, University of Ljubljana, and Daegu Gyeongbuk Institute of Science and Technology. Students can also transfer their studies to the University of Westminster.

== Diplomatic Academy of London ==
The Diplomatic Academy of London (DAL) is a graduate department of diplomatic studies at Westminster International University in Tashkent that offers programs of study in London on the campus of the University of Westminster. It offers graduate diplomas, both M.A. and Ph.D., in affiliation with the University of Westminster. It was originally established in 1988 by the Commonwealth of Nations as a program of study for diplomats from smaller member-nations of the Commonwealth. By 1992, it had evolved into a graduate department of diplomatic studies for foreign students studying at University of Westminster that was directed by Nabil Ayad with it offering both M.A. and Ph.D. diplomas through that university. The department was later absorbed into Westminster International University in Tashkent.

It should not be confused with the similarly named London Academy of Diplomacy which was a different institution that operated from 2010-2016.

== Notable alumni ==
- Gayane Umerova, art critic and curator
- Flyin Up

== See also ==
- Academic Lyceum of Westminster International University in Tashkent
