= Academic Lyceum of Westminster International University in Tashkent =

- Toshkent xalqaro Vestminster universiteti akademik litseyi

Location
- 25 Shakhrisabz Street; Tashkent; Uzbekistan
- 41°18′22″N 69°16′57″E

Information
- Type: Public academic lyceum
- Established: December 9, 2008
- Grades: Levels 1–2
- Enrollment: 323 (2025/26)
- Language: Uzbek, Russian, English
- Affiliation: Westminster International University in Tashkent
- Website: lyceum.wiut.uz

The Academic Lyceum of Westminster International University in Tashkent (Uzbek: Toshkent xalqaro Vestminster universiteti akademik litseyi; ALWIUT) is a public academic lyceum affiliated with Westminster International University in Tashkent in Tashkent, Uzbekistan. Established in 2008, the lyceum offers a two-year pre-university curriculum focused primarily on advanced mathematics and English.

In the 2021 national ranking of academic lyceums published by the State Inspectorate for Supervision of Quality in Education, ALWIUT was ranked second among academic lyceums across Uzbekistan.

== History ==
ALWIUT was established on 9 December 2008 by Decree No. 270 of the Uzbekistan's Cabinet of Ministers. Its first cohort of students graduated on 21 June 2012.

== Academics ==
ALWIUT operates on a semester system for its academic term, unlike the traditional four-quarter system used by most public schools in Uzbekistan. Students must complete four semesters over two years to graduate.

=== Admission ===
Admission to ALWIUT is highly competitive, as it ranks among the most selective academic lyceums in Uzbekistan. In 2021, the lyceum received over 3,500 applications for admission, of which 182 were admitted for a 5.2% acceptance rate.

The selection process consists of two stages. The first stage is an entrance examination administered by WIUT, which tests applicants' knowledge in advanced mathematics and English. Around 300 top-performing candidates are invited to the second stage, which is conducted by the Knowledge and Qualifications Assessment Agency. This phase includes assessments in IQ, mathematics, and English grammar.
