= International Press Club =

The International Press Club
- Formation: 2016
- Type: NGO, Nonprofit
- Purpose: Conducting analytical research, understanding public opinion, discussing socio-political situations, contributing to state governance
- Location: Uzbekistan
- Chairman: Jaloliddin Usmonov (as of February 8, 2022)
- Key people: Sherzodkhon Kudratkhuja (first chairman)

The International Press Club (IPC) is a non-governmental, non-profit organization based in Uzbekistan which focuses on conducting analytical research aimed at understanding public opinion, discussing socio-political situations within Uzbek society, and contributing to the development of state governance activities.

== Formation ==
The International Press Club was founded in 2016, prompted by the need to create an interactive media platform for the early presidential election. It was initially named Elections.uz-2016 Press Club. It hosted 12 sessions attended by 400 experts and 600 media representatives during this period.

The organization was officially registered by the Ministry of Justice of the Republic of Uzbekistan on March 31, 2017, as a non-governmental, non-profit entity. Sherzodkhon Kudratkhuja was elected as the first chairman of the organization. On February 8, 2022, Jaloliddin Usmonov was elected as the chairman, marking a change in leadership.

== Objective ==
The main goal of the International Press Club is to provide a platform for various political groups, government members, parliamentary representatives, and public associations to express their opinions. Furthermore, the International Press Club prepares analytical materials on the socio-economic development of regions, which are distributed through the media.

The club acts as a platform for representatives of state organizations to communicate the results of their institutions' activities to the public and to receive questions and suggestions. It facilitates open dialogues between representatives of state organs, independent experts, and the media to discuss pressing issues and find solutions.

== Activities ==
During its operation, the IPC has implemented projects such as "Tet-a-tet," "At a Distance," "Highlights of the Week," "Portrait," "Step by Step," and "Virtual". IPC sessions have attracted the attention of the general public and international organizations. Various projects of the United States Agency for International Development (USAID) have been discussed at IPC platforms, including USAID's efforts to assist tuberculosis patients in Uzbekistan.

The suspension of live broadcasts of the International Press Club's sessions in 2017 generated significant media attention. This situation was perceived by international media as a suppression of emerging freedom of speech in Uzbekistan. According to Voice of America, the prohibition of live broadcasts was allegedly due to interference by Prime Minister Abdulla Aripov, although these allegations were not confirmed. Technical difficulties were cited by IPC chairman Sherzodkhon Kudratkhodja as the reason for the interruption of live broadcasts. The IPC resumed live broadcasts on September 15, 2017, as reported by Kun.uz.

The December 3, 2020 session of the International Press Club, titled "Constitution and legislation on freedom of speech and press. Processes of developing the media in Uzbekistan," was interrupted during the live broadcast. This session featured discussions on freedom of speech issues in Uzbekistan with participation from international organizations like the OSCE and UN, as well as leaders of the Republic of Uzbekistan's state authorities and media representatives. The interruption of the live broadcast was widely discussed in the media and on social networks. According to international media reports, journalists and bloggers in the part of the session cut off from the live broadcast voiced their concerns about restrictions on freedom of speech in the country.
