= London Academy of Diplomacy =

The London Academy of Diplomacy was a graduate school for diplomatic studies that initially served foreign students studying at the University of East Anglia in London. It offered both post-graduate and doctoral degrees. The school was founded by Nabil Ayad in 2010, and was a member of Chatham House. Joseph Mifsud became director of the institution in 2012.

Initially the London Academy of Diplomacy's M.A. and Ph.D. degrees were awarded by the University of East Anglia, but the school moved to the University of Stirling in Scotland and that school began authenticating the school's diplomas beginning August 1, 2014. The school closed in 2016 following a scandal involving Mifsud and his attempt to connect Vladimir Putin to people involved in the Trump 2016 presidential campaign.

It should not be confused with the similarly named Diplomatic Academy of London which is a graduate department of diplomatic studies at Westminster International University in Tashkent that offers programs of study in London on the campus of the University of Westminster.
