= Joseph Mifsud =

Maltese academic (born 1960)

- Born: 1960 (age 65–66); Malta
- Education: University of Malta (BA); University of Padua (MA); Queen's University Belfast (PhD)

Joseph Mifsud (born 1960) is a Maltese academic who served as president of the Euro-Mediterranean University of Slovenia (2008–2012) and director of the London Academy of Diplomacy (2013–2016). He worked at institutions across Europe with ties to both Western and Russian governments, including Link Campus University in Rome, which has trained NATO intelligence personnel.

In April 2016, Mifsud told George Papadopoulos, a foreign policy advisor to the Trump presidential campaign, that Russian officials possessed "dirt" on Hillary Clinton in the form of "thousands of emails". This information, relayed by Papadopoulos to Australian diplomat Alexander Downer, prompted the FBI to open the Crossfire Hurricane investigation into possible ties between the Trump campaign and Russia.

Mifsud's intelligence affiliations have been disputed. Former FBI Director James Comey characterized him as a "Russian agent," while Papadopoulos and Republican lawmakers Devin Nunes and Jim Jordan suggested he may have been a Western intelligence operative. A December 2019 Justice Department Inspector General report found no evidence Mifsud was an FBI informant, and U.S. intelligence agencies told the inspector general he was not a U.S. asset.

Mifsud has not been seen publicly since October 2017. Special Counsel John Durham testified in June 2023 that his investigation had been unable to locate Mifsud and that he did not know whether Mifsud was "alive or dead".

== Education ==
Mifsud holds a bachelor's degree in education from the University of Malta (1982) and a master's degree in education from the University of Padua (1989). He was awarded a PhD in 1995 from Queen's University Belfast; his thesis was titled Managing Educational Reform: A Comparative Approach from Malta (and Northern Ireland); a Headteachers' Perspective.

== Career ==
From 1996 to 1998, Mifsud served as Chief Advisor to Malta's Ministry of Education. He was a key member of the team that negotiated Malta's entry into the European Union in 2004. During this period he represented Malta on the Bologna Follow-up Group, the Erasmus Mundus Committee, and other EU educational bodies.

Mifsud assisted in the 1999 founding of Link Campus University in Rome (a subsidiary of the University of Malta with links to Italian intelligence). Link Campus president Vincenzo Scotti said Mifsud formally served as a visiting professor for one semester in 2017, though a former employee said he played a key role in developing academic partnerships with universities in other countries. Link Campus has trained NATO intelligence personnel and hosted FBI agents; a 2004 CIA-sponsored conference at the university brought together officials from nearly 30 intelligence and police agencies.

From 2006 to 2008, Mifsud served as the chef de cabinet of the Ministry of Foreign Affairs of Malta. He later became a principal in the London Centre of International Law Practice (LCILP). In December 2008, he was unanimously elected President of the Euro-Mediterranean University of Slovenia (EMUNI), a priority project of the Union for the Mediterranean established following the Paris Summit. He departed in 2012; a Slovenian government report later criticized his management for lack of transparency and noted he left owing the institution approximately €30,000 in expenses.

In September 2013, Mifsud became director of the London Academy of Diplomacy, which trained diplomats, corporate officials, and government personnel from approximately 69 countries. The academy partnered with the University of Stirling in Scotland beginning in September 2014, and Mifsud held positions at both institutions. He simultaneously held an honorary professorship at the University of East Anglia from August 2013 to July 2016. The London Academy closed in 2016, and from May 2017 Mifsud served as a full-time professorial teaching fellow at Stirling until his resignation in November 2017.

Mifsud traveled extensively in both Western countries and Russia. In November 2014, he participated in an Organization of American States meeting in Washington. In February 2017, he spoke at an event organized by Global Ties, a nonprofit partner organization of the U.S. State Department, providing a "European perspective" on public diplomacy; the FBI interviewed him in Washington during this trip. He regularly attended meetings of the Valdai Discussion Club, an annual conference in Russia backed by the Kremlin and attended by Vladimir Putin. In April 2016, Mifsud spoke at a Valdai Club panel in Moscow alongside Switzerland-based lawyer Stephan Roh.

He has also served as president of the University Consortium of the Province of Agrigento in Sicily; in September 2018, an Italian court ordered him to repay the Consortium 49,000 euros ($56,700) in overpayments. As of 2017, Mifsud was a member of the European Council on Foreign Relations (ECFR). Roh, who has been associated with Russian oligarchs and who owns a 5% stake in Link Campus University, has been described by George Papadopoulos's wife as Mifsud's partner, best friend, and funder.

== Connection to George Papadopoulos and Carter Page ==
In March 2016, shortly after George Papadopoulos was named as a foreign policy advisor to the Trump campaign, Mifsud met Papadopoulos in Rome. They later met again in London, where – according to Papadopoulos – Mifsud claimed "substantial connections to Russian officials" and introduced Papadopoulos to a Russian woman that he falsely claimed was Putin's niece. At a meeting in April, Mifsud told Papadopoulos that he had learned that the Russian government had "dirt" on Hillary Clinton. Mifsud has acknowledged meeting Papadopoulos, but denied Papadopoulos's specific allegations.

On 10 May 2016, Papadopoulos repeated the information to the Australian High Commissioner in London, Alexander Downer, who was accompanied by Australian diplomat Erika Thompson, that "the Trump team had received some kind of suggestion from Russia that it could assist this process with the anonymous release of information during the campaign that would be damaging to Mrs. Clinton (and President Obama)." Downer later reported to American authorities that Papadopoulos had apparently known about Russia's theft of Democratic National Committee emails before it was publicly reported. Papadopoulos denies having told Downer this. The FBI then launched an investigation into possible connections between Russia and the Trump campaign. Mifsud was interviewed by the FBI in February 2017 while visiting the United States to speak at a conference. Mifsud left the United States on 11 February 2017.

While the connection between Mifsud and Papadopoulos is well-established, Carter Page belatedly admitted to greeting Mifsud:

And after first denying that he met with __ Joseph Mifsud,__ the Kremlin-linked professor revealed to be a key contact of George Papadopoulos, Page equivocated. 'I—you know, there may have been a greeting,' he said. 'I have no recollection of ever interacting with him in any way, shape or form . . . I have no personal relationship with him.'

== Disputed intelligence affiliations ==
Mifsud's true role and intelligence affiliations remain unresolved. Former FBI Director James Comey characterized Mifsud as a "Russian agent." The Mueller Report stated Mifsud "had connections to Russia" and "maintained various Russian contacts," including a former employee of the Internet Research Agency. Mifsud denied these characterizations, stating "I am an academic, I do not even speak Russian."

Critics of the FBI's investigation, including George Papadopoulos, Devin Nunes, and Jim Jordan, suggested Mifsud may have been a Western intelligence operative. They pointed to his extensive ties to Western institutions: Link Campus University in Rome, where Papadopoulos first met him, has trained NATO intelligence personnel; he served as chef de cabinet in Malta's Ministry of Foreign Affairs; and he was photographed with British Foreign Secretary Boris Johnson at a diplomatic event in October 2017. Papadopoulos alleged Mifsud was "an Italian intelligence asset," while Mifsud's Swiss lawyer Stephan Roh claimed he was "a Western intelligence element."

A December 2019 Justice Department Inspector General report found no evidence Mifsud was an FBI informant or that his involvement with Papadopoulos was related to any FBI operation. U.S. intelligence agencies told Inspector General Michael Horowitz that Mifsud was not among their assets. U.S. Attorney General William Barr and U.S. prosecutor John Durham met with Italian intelligence officials in Rome in late September 2019 to learn more about Mifsud and his contacts. Italian Prime Minister Giuseppe Conte stated that Italian intelligence services were not involved with Mifsud. When Horowitz asked Durham whether he had found anything to contradict the assessment that Mifsud was not a Western asset, Durham said he had no such evidence.

== Disappearance ==
Mifsud last spoke to his girlfriend on 31 October 2017, the day before an Italian newspaper revealed that the "professor" referred to in news reports about Papadopoulos was Mifsud; as of 27 February 2018, she had not heard from him again. His passport and wallet were later found to have been left in Câmara de Lobos, Portugal, on 5 August 2017, although the Maltese government was not informed until October 2019.

Photographic evidence showed Mifsud in Switzerland on 21 May 2018, and he lived in Link Campus University housing until the summer of that year. In September 2018, an Italian court described his location as "residence unknown". According to a filing in U.S. federal court in the case Democratic National Committee v. Russian Federation that month, Mifsud was "missing and may be deceased"; his whereabouts were unknown and he could not be served with the complaint.

According to media reports, Mifsud was in Rome as of April 2019. In November 2019, Corriere della Sera received a recording of someone claiming to be Mifsud; voice recognition experts with the U.K.-based investigative journalism group Bellingcat said that, based on tone and pronunciation, the recording matched verified recordings of Mifsud.

Durham was unable to locate Mifsud during his multi-year investigation. In June 2023 congressional testimony, Durham stated he did not know whether Mifsud was "alive or dead". Mifsud does not appear in Durham's final 306-page report released in May 2023, despite the extensive efforts to investigate him.

== See also ==
- Crossfire Hurricane (FBI investigation)
- List of people who disappeared mysteriously: post-1970
- Russian interference in the 2016 United States elections
- Trump Tower meeting § George Papadopoulos
