= Sherzodkhon Kudratkhuja =

Uzbek journalist (born 1974)

Sherzodkhon Kudratkhuja Sherzodxon Qudratxo`ja Шерзодхон Кудратходжа
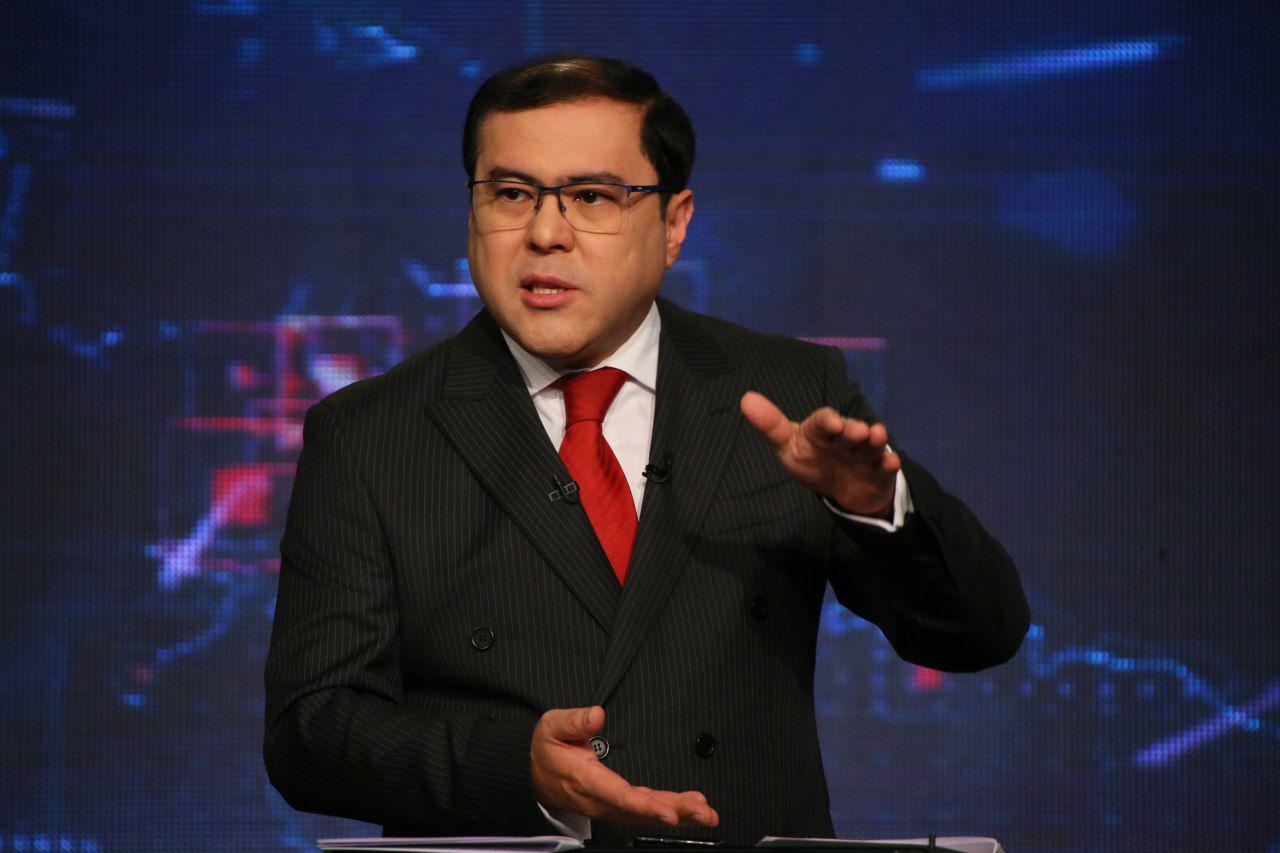
- President: Shavkat Mirziyoyev
- Minister: Abdulla Aripov

Personal details
- Born: 26 May 1974 (age 51)

Sherzodkhon Kudratkhuja (uzb: Sherzodxon Qudratxo`ja: ru: Шерзо́дхон Таджидди́н угли Кудратходжа́ born May 26, 1974, in Tashkent, Uzbekistan) - is a rector of University of Journalism and Mass Communications, Board Chairman of the Uzbekistan national media association. He is also Chairman of the International Press Club organization.

== Career ==
From 1991 to 1996, he studied at Tashkent State University. After completing his studies, he worked as an editor and political commentator at the Information Directorate of the Uzbek Broadcasting Corporation from 1996 to 1998. Following that, he served as the director of the international broadcasting Directorate of Uzbekistan from 1998 to 1999. From 1999 to 2000, he held the position of head of the press center and service. From 2012 to 2013, he served as the Head of the Department of Internet Journalism and Information Technology at the National University of Uzbekistan named after Mirzo Ulugbek. Following that, between 2013 and 2016, he held the position of Associate Professor in the Department of Methodology, Editing, and Internet Journalism at the same university. These experiences allowed him to contribute significantly to the field of journalism and technology education in Uzbekistan. Following 2016– 2017 years, he worked as an associate professor in the Department of digital media at the National University of Uzbekistan named after Mirzo Ulugbek. After that, from 2017 to 2018, he served as the head of the Department of press theory and practice at the same university. In 2017, he served as the Chairman of the International Press Club, a non-profit organization dedicated to promoting journalism and freedom of the press worldwide. Additionally, he held the position of Vice President in the International Kurash Association, an international governing body for the sport of Kurash. In 2018, he was appointed as the Rector of the University of Journalism and Mass Communications in Uzbekistan, where he oversaw the administration and development of the institution. Between 2000 and 2005, he served as a general consultant for the press service of the President of the Republic of Uzbekistan. Afterward, during the 2005 to 2008 years, he worked as the Press Secretary for the Prime Minister, Shavkat Mirziyoyev. Then, from 2008 to 2012, he assumed the role of Acting Head of the Department of Internet Journalism and Information Technology.
