= Link Campus University =

Private university in Rome, Italy

Coordinates: 41.9210°N 12.5167°E

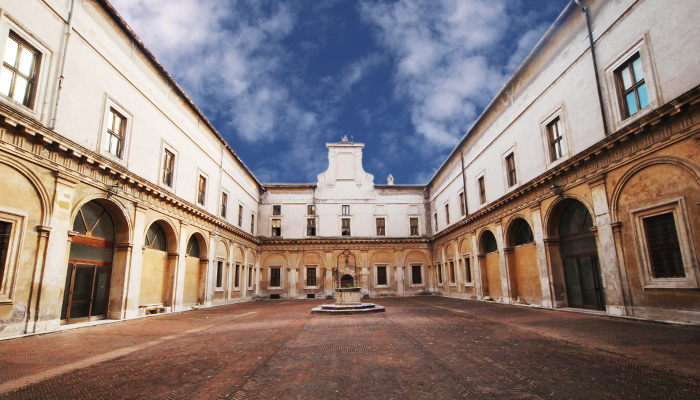
- Former name: Link Campus - University of Malta
- Established: 1999
- President: Vincenzo Scotti
- Rector: Claudio Roveda
- Location: Rome, Italy
- Campus: Urban
- Nickname: Link
- Website: www.unilink.it

Link Campus University (Italian: Università degli studi Link Campus University), formerly Link Campus—University of Malta, is a proprietary, for-profit university located in Rome, Italy. The university was founded in 1999 at the initiative of former Italian President Francesco Cossiga and former Maltese President Guido de Marco, with Vincenzo Scotti, former Italian Minister of the Interior and Foreign Affairs, serving as founding president. The university has trained intelligence and law enforcement personnel from NATO countries and has been described by Italian newspapers as either a "shady diploma mill or den of spies." The university is owned by CEPU, a for-profit Italian franchise chain.

== History and accreditation ==
The university was founded in 1999 as a branch of the University of Malta. The inauguration was carried out by the Rector of the University of Malta, Professor Roger Ellul Micallef, in the presence of former Italian President Francesco Cossiga and Irene Pivetti, former Speaker of the Italian Chamber of Deputies. In his remarks, Maltese President Guido de Marco described Link Campus as "another building block in the construction of a Pax Mediterranea." The university's library was later named after Cossiga and de Marco.

Cossiga, who served as Italy's Minister of the Interior during the Years of Lead and later as President, was known for his connections to Italian intelligence services; in 1990, he publicly acknowledged the existence of Operation Gladio, NATO's secret stay-behind network in Italy.

Link Campus was the first foreign university authorized to operate in Italy. On 4 July 2007, the Ministry of Education issued a decree under the Lisbon Convention of 1997 recognizing Link Campus degree requirements. In 2011, Link Campus became part of the Italian university system, ending its affiliation with Malta. Scotti served as president of the university for twenty years until 2020, when ownership transferred to CEPU.

== Intelligence and law enforcement training ==
Link Campus offers master's degrees in intelligence and security studies and has trained police officers from Italy, Malta, and Eastern European countries, as well as personnel from Brazil. In 2004, the CIA organized a conference at Link Campus titled "New Frontiers of Intelligence Analysis," bringing together officials from intelligence and police agencies of nearly 30 countries; a 24-year CIA veteran spent two years arranging the event. Former National Security Agency and CIA officers and analysts have regularly taught at the university.

Elisabetta Trenta, who served as Italy's Minister of Defence (2018–2019), was previously deputy director of Link Campus's master's program in intelligence and security.

== Russian academic partnerships ==
In October 2016, Link Campus signed a partnership agreement with Moscow State University, one of Russia's most prestigious universities. The agreement was signed in Moscow by Scotti, former Italian Foreign Minister Franco Frattini, and Maltese academic Joseph Mifsud. In December 2016, Mifsud hosted Alexey Klishin, an academic from the Moscow State Institute of International Relations (MGIMO), an institution run by Russia's Ministry of Foreign Affairs, for a lecture at Link Campus.

== Connection to Trump-Russia investigation ==
Link Campus was the site of the March 2016 meeting between Joseph Mifsud and George Papadopoulos, a foreign policy advisor to the Trump presidential campaign. According to the Mueller Report, Mifsud subsequently told Papadopoulos that Russian officials possessed "dirt" on Hillary Clinton, information that prompted the FBI to open the Crossfire Hurricane investigation.

Mifsud's exact role at Link Campus has been disputed. President Scotti said Mifsud formally served as a visiting professor for one semester in 2017, but a former employee told The Washington Post that Mifsud played a key role in developing academic partnerships with universities in other countries. Scotti severed ties with Mifsud after his involvement with Papadopoulos became public.

In September 2019, U.S. Attorney General William Barr and Special Counsel John Durham traveled to Rome to meet with Italian intelligence officials regarding Mifsud. Italian Prime Minister Giuseppe Conte stated that Italian intelligence services were not involved with Mifsud.

== Controversies ==
In 2020, Florence prosecutors indicted approximately 70 individuals, including Scotti, on charges of fraud and criminal association related to alleged "easy exams" at the university's political science faculty. Investigators found evidence that students missed classes, sat for unsupervised exams, knew questions in advance, and were allowed to consult the internet during examinations. Among those indicted were police officers and the secretary general of the SIULP police union.

== See also ==
- Joseph Mifsud
- Vincenzo Scotti
- Francesco Cossiga
- Guido de Marco
- Crossfire Hurricane (FBI investigation)
- Operation Gladio
