= Flyin Up =

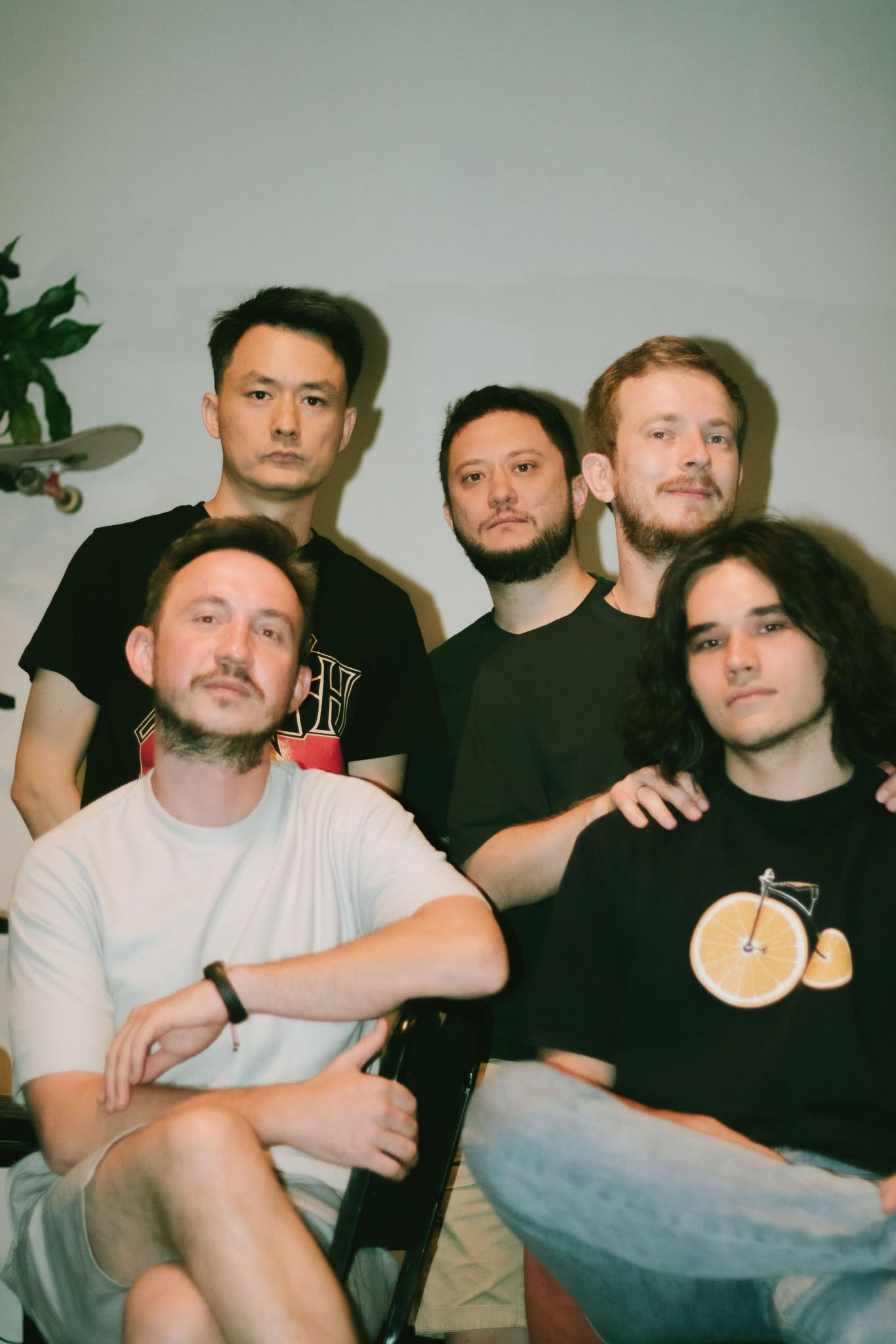
- Flyin Up, 2025

Background information
- Origin: Tashkent, Uzbekistan
- Genres: progressive rock, progressive metal, psychedelic rock, post-metal, folk metal
- Years active: 2012–present
- Label: Boshqa Musica
- Members: Jasur Khudayberdiyev; Rinat Bayburin; Sanjar Ismatov; Vladislav Dostavalov; Roman Shirshov
- Past members: Shukhrat Sagatov; Kamronbek Mukhammadiev; Alexei Mikheev; Artem Shcherbakov
- Website: www.facebook.com/FlyinUp

Flyin Up is a rock band from Uzbekistan that blends psychedelic and progressive rock/metal with post-metal and elements of Central Asian ethnic music.

== History ==
Flyin Up was formed in 2012 within the walls of Westminster International University in Tashkent by two guitarists, Rinat Bayburin and Shukhrat Sagatov. The musicians began by playing covers of Led Zeppelin, The Beatles, Metallica and Deep Purple. Drummer Kamronbek Mukhammadiev soon joined the band, and the guys asked Vladislav Dostavalov to learn to play the bass guitar. The lineup was completed when vocalist Jasur Khudayberdiev became part of the group.

The band released its first album of original material, titled Ragnarock, in 2016. In its early years, Flyin Up changed locations several times — moving to Almaty in 2015 and to Moscow in 2017 (which led to the departure of drummer Kamronbek Mukhammadiev), where they took part in the international rock music competition Emergenza. However, in 2019 the band returned to their homeland, and gave a major concert at Anhor Lokomotiv Park under the banner of Adrenaline Rush, performing songs from their debut album as well as tracks from their new release Roaming that was mixed by a drummer of the "Moscow" period Alexei Mikheev.

In 2020, the band performed at IlkhomRockFest on the stage of the Ilkhom Theatre, where they played not only older material but also several new songs. In collaboration with the Ilkhom Theatre, they released a music video for the song Dunyolar. Flyin Up has been a regular participant in the theater's musical events. Around the same time, guitarist Shukhrat Sagatov left the band for personal reasons and was replaced by Sanjar Ismatov.

In 2021, the band took part in the international Kol Fest festival, held on the shores of Lake Issyk-Kul in Kyrgyzstan. That same year, a Russian-language single titled "Valhalla" was released in collaboration with jazz and folk singer Feride Girgin, marking the band's transition from textbook post-metal to a new sound with a stronger emphasis on ethnic and psychedelic elements.

In 2023, Flyin Up released their first album in the Uzbek language, Jimlik (Uzbek for "Silence"), along with an animated film featuring songs from the album. The recording process included the use of traditional instruments such as the oud and the qiyak. Among the guest musicians was renowned Tashkent-based jazz multi-instrumentalist Sanjar Nafikov. In August 2023, the band represented Uzbekistan at the Vaba Lava theater festival in Estonia.

In 2024, Flyin Up was spotlighted as the "Weekly Featured Artist" by the independent American online music journalism platform Everything Is Noise. That same year, vocalist Jasur Khudayberdiev took part in the Uzbek edition of the international project The Voice. The band's new drummer became Roman Shirshov, a member of the popular Uzbek indie band Bu Qala.

== Critical reception ==
Dunyolar showcases the band’s metaphysical sensibilities, a perception of the spirituality that seems to emanate from the ground of Central Asia. A cautious fascination with the metaphysical and the gentle ballet between humans and their natural world infuse the psychedelic, dynamically emotional music the band produces

— Everything Is Noise,

Their songs are patient explorations of the space and time we dwell in, interspersed with elements of the local region and the Uzbek language, which make them truly special.

— Metal Temple,

== Band members ==
Current

- Jasur Khudayberdiyev — vocals (2012—present)
- Rinat Bayburin — guitars (2012—present)
- Sanjar Ismatov — guitars (2020—present)
- Vladislav Dostavalov — bass (2012—present)
- Roman Shirshov — drums (2024—present)

Former

- Shukhrat Sagatov — guitars (2012—2020)
- Kamronbek Mukhammadiev — drums (2012—2018)
- Alexei Mikheev — drums (2018—2019)
- Artem Shcherbakov — drums (2017—2024)

Timeline

== Discography ==
=== Studio albums ===
- Ragnarock (2016)
- Roaming (2019)
- Jimlik (2023)

=== Singles ===
- O'zbegim (2017)
- Dunyolar (2020)
- Valhalla (2021)
- XX (2026)
