= Education in Uzbekistan =

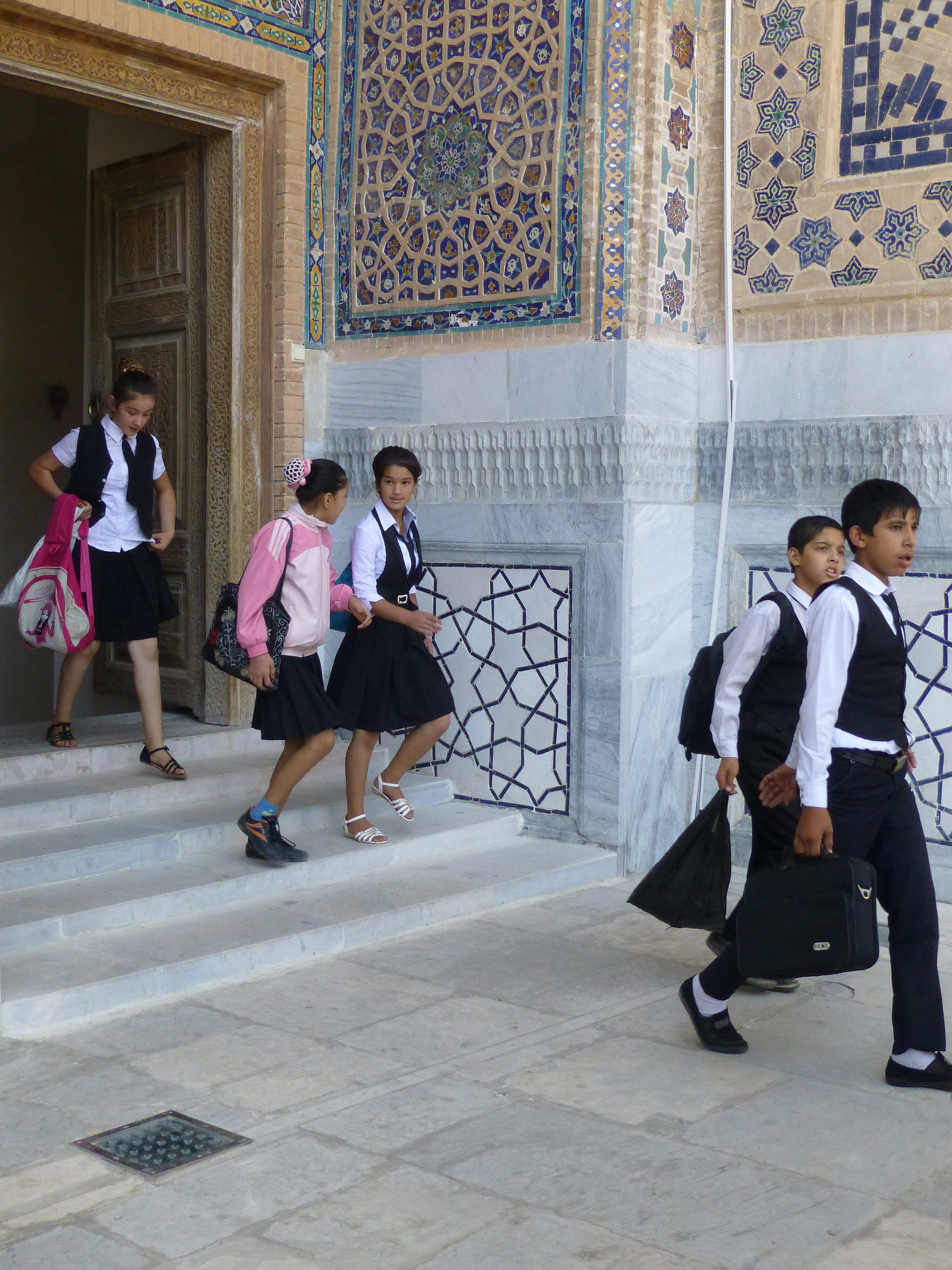
Uzbek students visiting Samarkand

Education in Uzbekistan is categorized by division into stages by age groups, and into different schools and classes by language of instruction. Majority of schooling in Uzbekistan is provided by the government, but there are some private institutions on all levels of education. The Uzbek grading scale runs from 2 (Very poor) to 5 (Excellent), and students attend school Monday through Saturday.

Uzbekistan's education system is generally managed by the Ministry of Education and Science, merged from the previous Ministries of Preschool and School Education and Higher Education, Science and Innovations, in October 2026.. Furthermore, there are agencies with roles in certain areas as prescribed by the President of Uzbekistan.

== Structure ==
The public compulsory school system is divided into two broad stages: primary (from Grade 1 to 4) and secondary (from Grade 5 to 11). Students are typically enrolled at the age of 7 and commonly end their secondary education at the age of 18, therefrom they either start their career or matriculate at a university.

=== Pre-school ===
By the end of 2024, Uzbekistan had 38,058 functioning pre-school education institutions, consisting of both public and family-based (non-state) organizations. Among them, 28,729 were family-based kindergartens, illustrating the rapid expansion of private early-childhood education across the country.

=== Secondary Education ===
As of the 2024/2025 academic year, Uzbekistan operates 10,943 general education schools, including 455 non-state schools. The total number of pupils enrolled in general secondary education reached approximately 6.78 million students at the beginning of 2024/2025.

=== Higher education ===
Entrance exams for public universities, commonly referred to as DTM, are administered by the State Test Center. These exams hold significant weight as they establish the cut-off points from the applicants' pool for the same program. Consequently, they serve as a sole criterion for awarding scholarships. Uzbekistan has experienced rapid growth in its higher education sector over the past several years. As of the 2024/2025 academic year, the country has 222 higher education institutions, an increase of 95 institutions (or 74.8%) compared to the 2020/2021 academic year.

A master-class on Wikipedia at the Inha University in Tashkent

Upper or vocational education is provided through a network of schools:

- Professional Technical School. Graduates receive a Junior Specialist Diploma equal to a Certificate of Complete Secondary Education.
- Technical College. Graduates receive a Junior Specialist Diploma equal to a Certificate of Complete Secondary Education.
- Lyceum or various training courses offered by higher education institutions or industry. Graduates receive a Junior Specialist Diploma or Diploma of Academic Lyceum equal to a Certificate of Complete Secondary Education.

In 2017, education reforms in Uzbekistan changed from 12-year program to 11 years after a previous reform disappointed and troubled parents and children. Eleven years of primary and secondary education are obligatory, starting at age seven. The rate of attendance in those grades is high, although the figure is significantly lower in rural areas than in urban centers. Preschool registration has decreased significantly since 1991.

== History of education ==
=== Middle ages (9th - 16th century) ===
In historical Uzbekistan and general Central Asia, written records attest to the existence of institutions devoted to educational and scientific pursuits in the form of madrasas since at least the 9th century AD. Under the reign of the Samanids, madrasas were found in cities such as Samarkand, Termez, Fergana and Khorezm, continuing to develop during the 10th to 12th century all around Central Asia as these cities boomed and became local centers of education and science during what is considered a cultural renaissance in the region.

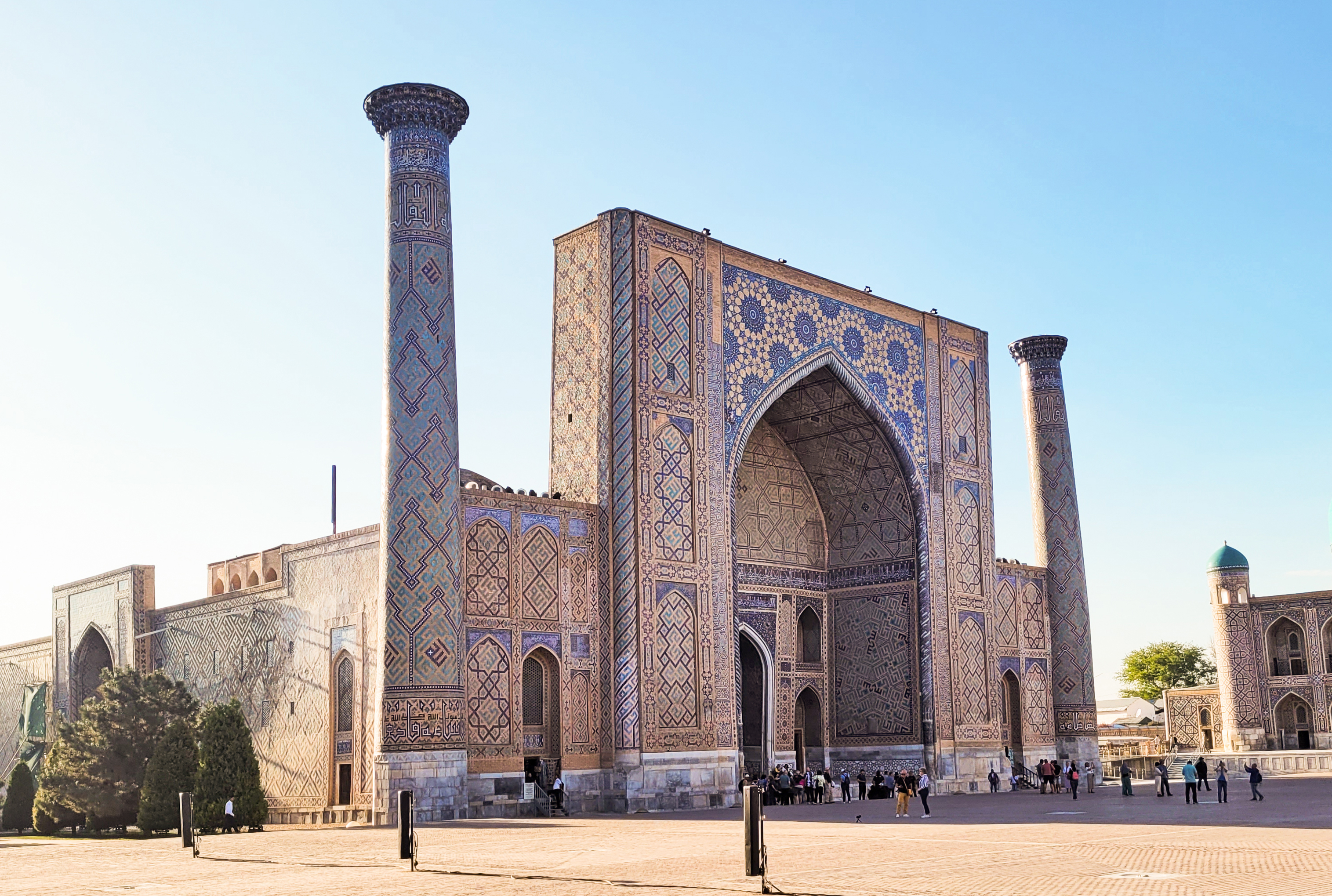
The Samarkand Ulugh Beg Madrasa, built in the 15th century by the namesake Timurid leader Ulugh Beg.

Following the Mongol conquest of Central Asia, the education system in place endured a crisis affecting its activities which only stopped under the reign of the Timurids a century later, under which a new revival for the madrasa system came to be, centered on the newly built "Ulugh Beg Madrasas" (in Samarkand and Bukhara) which became important regional centers of learning for both religious and secular scholars. The education system went on a new decline in the late middle ages in the region, before and around the time of the formation of three khanates in Uzbekistan in the 16th century (Khanate of Bukhara, Khanate of Kokand and the Khanate of Khiva). This latter period's education is characterized by the strong presence and influence of scholasticism and Muslim conservatism.

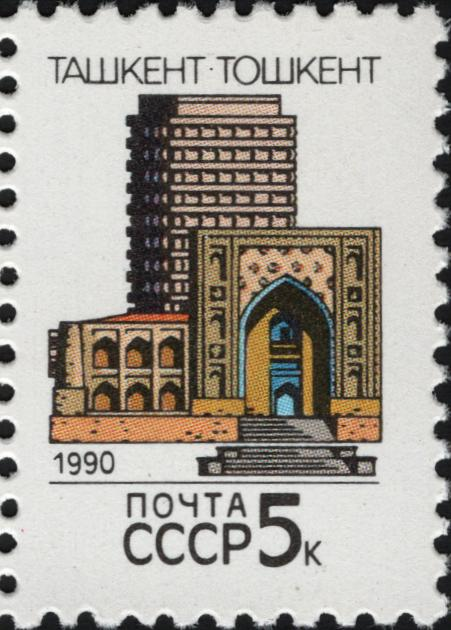
USSR Post stamp depicting the Kukeldash Madrasah and the National University in Tashkent

=== Modern history ===
Towards the 20th century, the education in the region was experiencing many changes. The current state of education in Uzbekistan was mainly shaped during the Soviet period, when USSR standardized education and many Universities were created in major cities.

==== USAID ====
USAID's Early Grade Reading Assessment (EGRA) and Early Grade Math Assessment (EGMA) are supporting Uzbekistan's Ministry of Education and Science by providing more precise data on student performance and evaluating proficiency in key skills. For the first time, Uzbekistan will gain standardized data on student learning outcomes through these assessments, helping to identify gaps and shape future initiatives. The EGRA and EGMA will involve a sample of over 11,000 students from grades 2 and 4 across the country, focusing on their reading and math abilities.

=== Statistics ===
==== Language of instruction in 2021, according to Ministry of Education ====
	Total	Uzbek	Karakalpak	Turkmen	Tajik	Kyrgyz	Kazakh	Russian	Other languages
Karakalpakstan	352,298	152,360 43.24%	125,565 35.64%	10,347 2.93%	- 0%	- 0%	20,411 5.79%	43,615 12.38%	- 0%
Andijan Region	572,250	514,702 89.94%	- 0%	- 0%	- 0%	2689 0.46%	- 0%	54.675 9,55%	144 0.02%
Bukhara Region	324,847	303,963 93.57%	- 0%	- 0%	8 0,002%	- 0%	684 0.21%	20,192 6.21%	- 0%
Fergana Region	673,187	603,412 89,63%	- 0%	- 0%	15.275 2,26%	489 0,07%	- 0%	53.867 8%	144 0,02%
Jizzakh Region	255,854	238,882 93,36%	- 0%	- 0%	1109 0,43%	3936 1,53%	67 0,02%	11,860 4,63%	- 0%
Kashkadarya Region	633,156	604,991 95,55%	- 0%	- 0%	11,039 1,74%	- 0%	- 0%	17,126 2,70%	- 0%
Khorezm Region	359,655	333,255 92,58%	- 0%	555 0,15%	- 0%	- 0%	216 0,06%	25,629 7,12%	- 0%
Namangan Region	510,948	466,127 91,22%	- 0%	- 0%	1123 0,21%	289 0,05%	- 0%	43,409 8,49%	- 0%
Navoiy Region	183,051	158,416 86,53%	285 0,15%	- 0%	760 0,41%	- 0.06%	8355 4,56%	15,241 8,32%	0 0%
Samarkand Region	745,705	680,536 91,26%	- 0%	- 0%	8684 1,16%	- 0%	- 0%	56,485 7,57%	- 0.01%
Surxondaryo Region	509,355	480,497 94,33%	- 0%	- 0%	19,715 3,87%	- 0%	- 0%	9143 1,79%	- 0%
Sirdaryo Region	156,208	145,482 93,13%	- 0%	- 0%	721 0,46%	- 0%	57 0,03%	9948 6,36%	- 0%
Tashkent City	481,750	264,654 54,93%	- 0%	- 0%	- 0%	- 0%	- 0%	215,846 44,80%	1250 0,25%
Tashkent Region	505,456	408,424 80,80%	- 0%	- 0%	6924 1,36%	780 0.15%	23,768 4,70%	65,560 12,97%	- 0%
Subtotal in Uzbekistan	6,263,726	5,355,701 85,50%	125,850 2%	10,902 0,17%	65,358 1,04%	8183 0,13%	53,558 0,85%	642,636 10,25%	1538 0,02%

== Criticism ==
=== Falling public standards ===
The official literacy rate is 99 percent. However, in the post-Soviet era educational standards have fallen. Funding and training have not been sufficient to effectively educate the expanding younger cohorts of the population. Between 1992 and 2004, government spending on education dropped from 12 percent to 6.3 percent of gross domestic product.

In 2006 education’s share of the budget increased to 8.1 percent. Lack of budgetary support has been more noticeable at the primary and secondary levels, as the government has continued to subsidize university students.

Between 1992 and 2001, university attendance dropped from 19 percent of the college-age population to 6.4 percent. The three largest of Uzbekistan’s 63 institutions of higher learning are in Nukus, Samarkand, and Tashkent, with all three being state funded.
