= Uzbekistan national media association =

- O‘zbekiston Milliy media birlashmasi
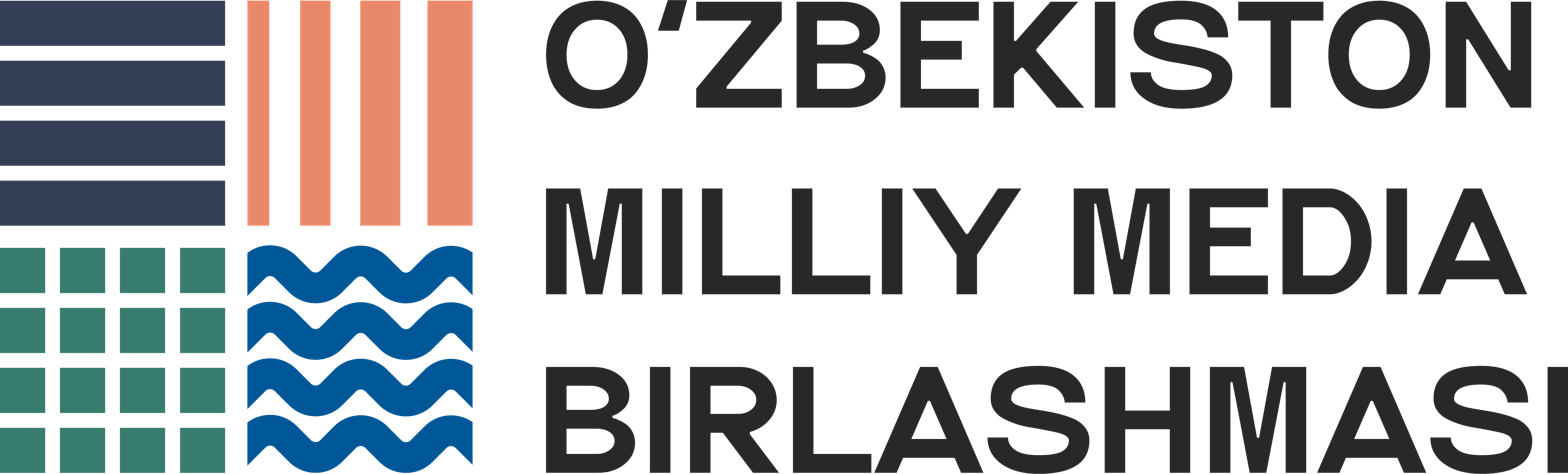
- Founder: 2003
- Type: NGO
- Location: Tashkent, Uzbekistan
- Chairman of the Board: Sherzodkhon Kudratkhuja
- General Director: Abduaziz Abutalipov
- Website: milliymedia.uz

Uzbekistan national media association (O‘zbekiston Milliy media birlashmasi) is a non-governmental organization founded in 2003 that unites the country's mass media outlets. The association is dedicated to developing the media industry, supporting journalists, and implementing various educational and professional projects. It actively works on fostering a modern media environment, promotes freedom of speech, and supports the professional growth of journalists, playing a significant role in shaping the country's information policy.

== History ==
The National media association of Uzbekistan was initially established as the National Association of Electronic Mass Media of Uzbekistan in 2003 by Firdavs Abdukhalikov to strengthen the media sphere of Uzbekistan and promote the development of independent journalism. The Association sets itself the task of publicizing socially significant problems, maintaining freedom of speech, and raising the professional level of journalists. In 2022, the organization changed its name to the National Media Association of Uzbekistan. In 2025, Sherzodkhon Kudratkhuja became the chairman of the organization.

== Structure ==
The National media association of Uzbekistan includes more than 53 mass media outlets, including:

- 22 TV channels;
- 18 radio stations;
- 8 online TV channels;
- 2 Internet publications;
- 1 journal;
- 1 platform
- International Press Club.

== Main projects ==
Uzbekistan national media association is implementing numerous initiatives aimed at developing the media industry:

- "Debat Xoll" Media Center - a platform for discussing various public events of a political nature;
- “Renaissance” National Award Ceremony: Aligned with presidential decree No. PP-294 (June 27, 2022) on supporting media professionals and advancing journalism.

=== Media forums ===
- "Radio Day" - an event dedicated to World Radio Day (February 13);
- "Point of Unity" - an event dedicated to World Press Freedom Day (May 3);
- "Media Week" is a series of media conferences dedicated to World Media Day (June 27).

=== Conferences ===
- Press secretaries and media representatives;
- Women's Media Club;
- for the artistic council of the association members;
- For all non-state television and radio channels.

=== Educational projects ===
- Seminars and trainings with the participation of local and international experts;
- Joint projects with international partners such as France 24, TRT Avaz, the Konrad Adenauer Foundation, and UNICEF;
- “Media Camp” summer program: Jointly organized with international media partners for aspiring journalists.

== Partners ==
- National Agency of Cinematography of Uzbekistan;
- International organizations such as the Konrad Adenauer Foundation, UNESCO, UNICEF, Xinhua News Agency, the UN Population Fund, as well as the SCO People's Diplomacy Center in Uzbekistan;
- Interaction with foreign broadcasters such as BBC, CNN, Euronews, France Medias Monde and TRT Avaz, France 24 and the Media Corporation of China.
