= Oganes Tatevosyan =

Soviet Armenian painter (1889–1974)

Oganes Karapetovich Tatevosyan (3 January 1889, Yerevan – 7 March 1974, Moscow) was a landscape painter and People's Artist of Uzbekistan (1945). He studied at the Moscow School of Painting, Sculpture and Architecture (1911–1917). From 1917 to 1966 he lived in Uzbekistan, and from 1966 onwards in Moscow. A master of landscape painting, Tatevosyan depicted the nature of Uzbekistan, its working people, and the ancient cities of Samarkand and Bukhara in a distinctive style. His works include the Old Samarkand series (Noon. Street Scene, 1915; Registan Square at Noon, 1916; Teahouse at Night, 1916; In Front of the Sherdor Madrasa, 1917, and others), The Outing (1918), Garden Path (1928), Melon Market (1929), At the Construction of the Kattakurgan Reservoir (1940), Spring (1961), Spring on the Outskirts of Tashkent (1961), and Spring Troubles (1962), among others. He also created posters and still lifes (Tulips, Roses, 1947; Fruit, 1950, and others). His works are held in museums and collections in Uzbekistan and abroad.

== Biography ==
- From 1906, he studied at the school of the Caucasian Society for the Encouragement of Fine Arts in Tiflis.
- From 1909 to 1916, he studied at the Moscow School of Painting, Sculpture and Architecture.
- From 1922 to 1927, he studied at the ceramics department of Vkhutemas / Vkhutein (All‑Union Artistic and Technical Workshops).
- He lived and worked in Uzbekistan. In 1921, he was sent from Moscow to Yerevan on an assignment.
- He was one of the founders of the Samarkand School of Art (Samarkand Commune) and the Yerevan Art College, serving as its director in 1922.
- From 1937, he served as the chief artist of the Uzbekistan pavilion at the Exhibition of Achievements of the National Economy (VDNKh) in Moscow.

He worked in:

- Yerevan (1914–1915)
- Tashkent (1917–1966)
- Moscow (1966–1974)

Hovhannes Tatevosyan's works are held in numerous state museums of the former Soviet republics, including the National Gallery of Armenia, as well as in private galleries and collections.

== Works ==
- Tiflis (1911)
- Sunny Motif (study) (1913)
- Teahouse (1913)
- Registan Square at Noon (1916), State Museum of Oriental Art, Moscow
- Samarkand Market (1917)
- Sunny Motif (1917)
- Street in Samarkand
- A Corner of Yerevan
- View of Yerevan
- Samarkand. Autumn Market (1947)
- Street in Ashgabat (study)
- Bust of an Uzbek Woman (study for the painting Fruit Harvest) (c. 1930)

== Exhibitions ==
His solo exhibitions were held in Moscow (1912, and posthumously in 2011) and in Yerevan (1966).
