= Umid Foundation =

The Umid Foundation was established on the initiative of the President of the Republic of Uzbekistan to organise the overseas education of Uzbek citizens. The first students were sent abroad in 1997. Students have also studied in other countries around the world, including South Korea, Japan, and Germany. The smallest number of students were educated in France and Italy.

Financial problems with the foundation began to emerge in 1998, when scholarships for some students were delayed. After that, some students were sent home without the means to pay the remainder of their tuition fees. To avoid an open admission of financial insolvency, the 'Umid' Foundation was merged with the former 'Ustoz' Foundation to form the new 'Istedod' Foundation.

The main condition was an agreement to work for five years in the location to which a special commission assigned them.

From the summer of 2001, students began to be trained at the Chirchiq Tank School. The students fired various types of firearms, rode in armoured vehicles, learned to wear gas masks, practised providing first aid to the injured, and so on.

On 3 January 2020, an international conference of graduates of the former presidential 'Umid' Foundation's scholarship programmes was held in Tashkent, attended by 300 former grant recipients of the foundation. It was found that 120 of the 300 graduates who attended the conference are living and working abroad.
