= Department of Politics and International Relations, University of Oxford =

Department of English university

The Department of Politics and International Relations (DPIR) is an academic department in the Social Sciences Division of the University of Oxford in Oxford, England.

== History ==
The department was established in 2000. It has been observed that a 'distinctive institutional feature of Oxford over the [20th] century ... (and ... a feature considered detrimental by some authors) was its remarkably late "departmentalization" of political science and international relations.' The Oxford philosophy, politics and economics (PPE) degree had been offered since 1920, and in 1934 the Sub-Faculty of Politics was established within the Faculty of Social Sciences.

== Rankings ==
As of November 2021, the Times Higher Education World University Rankings ranks Oxford first for politics and international studies (including development studies) overall, and for research, and fifth for teaching.

The Academic Ranking of World Universities, as of November 2021, ranks Oxford ninth in a worldwide listing of universities for the study of political sciences; the only higher-ranked UK institution was the London School of Economics.

As of November 2021, Oxford is ranked first in the Complete University Guide listing for the study of politics in British universities.
