= Samarkand Half Marathon =

Road running event in Samarkand, Uzbekistan

The Samarkand Half Marathon (abbreviated as SHM) is an annual half marathon held in Samarkand, Uzbekistan. It is organised by the Foundation for the Development of Culture and Art under the Ministry of Culture of the Republic of Uzbekistan, the Ministry of Culture, the State Committee for Tourism Development, and the administration of Samarkand Region. The aim of the marathon is to promote a healthy lifestyle and to create an inclusive environment at cultural sites.

== Samarkand Half Marathon 2019 ==
The half marathon traditionally takes place on the first Sunday of November. The first race, held on 3 November 2019, brought together 1,176 runners from 25 countries. In addition to the main 21 km distance, participants could also compete in 2 km and 10 km races. The main charitable objective of the 2019 Samarkand Half Marathon was to draw attention to the issue of inclusivity at cultural and arts venues, as well as to promote a healthy lifestyle and develop sports tourism in Uzbekistan. The funds raised from the event were used to implement a project to create an accessible environment for visually impaired persons at one of the theatres in Tashkent. The programme included staging a performance using audio commentary on the theatre stage.

== Samarkand Half Marathon 2020 ==
In 2020, due to the unstable epidemiological situation related to the coronavirus infection, the marathon was held in two formats: a virtual marathon (participants could complete the marathon distance from anywhere in the world using the Strava mobile app) and a race with the participation of 43 professional athletes (distance – 21 km). The mission of the 2020 Samarkand Half Marathon was to focus attention on the issue of autism. The event discussed the creation of an inclusive environment for people with autism and their opportunities for integration into the country's social, cultural, and public life. The funds raised from the competition were allocated to establishing a children's creative studio at specialised boarding schools for children in Uzbekistan.

== 21.1 km race winners ==
=== Men ===
Date	Winner	Country	Time
3 November 2019	Shokhrukh Davlatov	Uzbekistan	1:07:46
1 November 2020	Andrey Petrov	Uzbekistan	1:05:42
1 November 2021	Shokhrukh Davlatov	Uzbekistan	1:05:55
1 November 2022	Evgeniy Fadeev	Uzbekistan	1:08:02
1 November 2023	Mikhail Kulkov	Russia	1:07:08
1 November 2024	Rinas Akhmadeev	Russia	1:03:42

=== Women ===
Date	Winner	Country	Time
3 November 2019	Nurkhon Mukhiddinova	Uzbekistan	1:18:53
1 November 2020	Sitora Khamidova	Uzbekistan	1:11:58
1 November 2021	Gulshanoi Satarova	Kyrgyzstan	1:15:44
1 November 2022	Gulshanoi Satarova	Uzbekistan	1:16:34
1 November 2023	Sviatlana Kudzelich	Belarus	1:17:54
1 November 2024	Ainuska Kalil kyzy	Kyrgyzstan	1:15:57
