= The Knowledge and Qualifications Assessment Agency =

- Formation: May 14, 1994
- Headquarters: Bog'ishamol Str., Tashkent, Uzbekistan
- Director: Majid Karimov
- Website: https://dtm.uz/

The Knowledge and Qualifications Assessment Agency (Uzbek: Bilim va malakalarni baholash agentligi) is an Uzbek state organisation, tasked with development, organisation and delivery of university admission tests for Uzbek nationals who are willing to enter an Uzbek institution.

Besides the administration of university admission tests, they are also developing the National Certification which is a paid subject-based examination, seeking to rate the competence of a test-taker in a given subject.

In addition to the managing assessments, the State Test Center is responsible for allocation of the test-takers across the universities of their choice and determining whether they are eligible for a government scholarship.
