= Nabil Ayad =

British academic

Nabil Ayad is an academic in the field of diplomacy and international governance. He is currently a member of the International Institute for Strategic Studies, the Royal Institute of International Affairs and an Associate Member of the London Diplomatic Association.

== Career ==
Ayad coined the term "virtual diplomacy" in 1986. During that time period, he pioneered exploration of information technology's impact on diplomacy. He has done extensive pioneering work in the area of diplomacy and through his vision, diplomacy has become a discipline unto itself, and London Diplomatic Academy has been recognised as the world leader in the field.

In recognition of his contribution to world diplomacy and the training of the new generation of diplomats in Central Asia, and the development of education in the Republic of Uzbekistan, the government of Uzbekistan conferred two honours on Dr. Ayad, an Honorary Doctorate of Science by the University of World Economy and Diplomacy, Foreign Ministry of Uzbekistan, September 1999, and an Honorary Doctor of Philosophy by the Tashkent State University of Oriental Studies.

Dr. Ayad lectures on Diplomacy in Islam; Intelligence and National Security and Intercultural Communication, as part of the MA degree in diplomatic studies. In 2011, Dr. Ayad introduced four master's degree programs at London Academy of Diplomacy on the following:

- International Diplomacy.
- International Business and Diplomacy.
- International Security and Diplomacy.
- International Communication and Diplomacy.

Prior to joining UEA London in August 2010, Dr. Ayad pioneered in 1980 the introduction of integrated diplomatic training programmes at the University of Westminster and organised courses and training programmes for diplomats and other government officials from the Commonwealth, Arab World, Africa, Eastern and Central Europe, the Caribbean, Central Asia and China. Most of these training programmes were sponsored by the British Foreign and Commonwealth Office and the British Council as well as groups sponsored by their own governments such as Kuwait, Iraq, United Arab Emirates, Saudi Arabia and China.

He was also involved in the supervision of research students. For example, during the academic year 2009–2010, four of his research students have been awarded PhD degrees on topics including:

- Towards an E-Government: The Case of Dubai.
- Diplomatic Negotiations: Romania's Accession to the European Union: a Case Study.
- Effective Diplomacy and Nation-Building: A Critical Study of the Tribal Diplomacy Adopted by three Arabian Gulf Clans (and its contribution to the Establishment of two modern nation states -1716-1826).
- Paradigms in Caribbean Trade Diplomacy: Negotiating the Economic Partnership with the EU.

Since 1995, he has organised a series of international symposia entitled Diplomacy Beyond 2000 and Diplomacy in the 21st century in London and Paris for the benefit of the student body. The conferences have attracted members of the London and Paris Diplomatic Corps, senior UK government officials, academics and decision makers from overseas governments. Conferences included:

- Diplomacy Beyond 2000, April 1995.
- Are Diplomats Really Necessary?, April 1996.
- The Information Explosion: A Challenge for Diplomacy, April 1997.
- Diplomacy and Divinity: Religion in International Relations, April 1998.
- The Impact of Technology on Intelligence and Security, March 1999.
- Ethics in International Practice April 2000.
- Divinity, Diplomacy and Development, May 2000, Paris.
- Refugees and Minorities in International Relations, April 2001.
- Institutional Corruption and Good Governance, May 2001, Paris.
- Media and Terrorism, December 2001, Paris.
- The UN and the Media in War and Peace, October 2002.
- Diplomacy and Gender, April 2003.
- Reforming the UN and the Future of Multilateralism, March 2004.
- International Security and the Dynamics of the New Diplomacy: Image Projection and Reputation Management, May 2006 (organised in conjunction with Foreign Affairs Canada).
- The International Dimensions of European Values May 2007.
- Transformational Public Diplomacy: Shaping the Future of International Relations, April 2008 (organised in conjunction with the American Embassy, London and University of Southern California, centre on Public Diplomacy).

In March 2012, Dr. Ayad will organise the seventeenth international symposium in the series of Diplomacy in the 21st Century entitled: "Diplomatic Practice, Global Commerce and International Security in the Age of Heteropolarity".

At London Academy of Diplomacy, Dr. Ayad continues the tradition of innovation in diplomatic training and the conduct of international relations in a rapidly changing international environment in the age of heteropolarity.

== Selected publications ==
- 2009: Strategic Public Diplomacy: Shaping the Future of International Relations (with Daryl Copelad) The Diplomatic Academy of London, University of Westminster 2009.
- The Impact of Technology on Intelligence and Security (edited), Diplomatic Academy of London Press, University of Westminster 2006.
- 2005: Diplomacy and Divinity: Religion in International Relations (edited with Sir Peter Marshall), Diplomatic Academy of London Press, University of Westminster 2005.
- 2004: Towards the Virtual University: Trends and Strategies.
- 1999: Are Diplomats Really Necessary? The Hydra in a Mutating Environment Edited with Sir Peter Marshall, University of Westminster Press, 1999.
- 1999: The Information Explosion: A Challenge for Diplomacy edited with Sir Peter Marshall, University of Westminster Press, 1999.
- 1996: Diplomacy beyond 2000 edited with Sir Peter Marshall, University of Westminster Press, 1996.
- 1990: Edited The Dynamics of Diplomacy by Sir Peter Marshall, The Diplomatic Academy of London, 1990.

Articles in books

- “Threats to Global Security from Terrorism: Intelligence Services and Non-State Actors” in The Impact of Technology on Intelligence and Security. Edited by Nabil Ayad, The Diplomatic Academy of London Press, 2006.
- “Information Technology and the Future of Diplomatic Training,” in Diplomacy beyond 2000, edited with Sir Peter Marshall, University of Westminster Press, 1999.
- “Information Technology and Diplomatic Training: The Hydra in a Mutating Environment,” in Are Diplomats Really Necessary? Edited with Sir Peter Marshall, University of Westminster Press, 1999.
- “The Information Explosion and the Future of Diplomatic Training,” in The Information Explosion: A Challenge for Diplomacy, edited with Sir Peter Marshall, University of Westminster Press, 1999.

Lectures

- International Security in the Age of Fear at China Foreign Affairs University, October 2008, Beijing, China.
- Member of the panel on ‘The Role of the Media in the Arab-Israel Relations: Stereotyping or Bridging Gaps'? June 2009, House of Lords, London.
- “Information Technology and the Future of Diplomatic Training,” 1st International Symposium Diplomacy Beyond 2000, University of Westminster, April 1995.
- A series of Lectures on Diplomatic Training Information Technology, at the Uzbek Ministry for Foreign Affairs, University of World Economy and Diplomacy, and the Tashkent State University for Oriental Studies, June 1995.
- “Information Technology and Diplomatic Training: The Hydra in a Mutating Environment,” 2nd International Symposium: Diplomacy Beyond 2000.
- Are Diplomats Really Necessary?” University of Westminster, April 1996.
- “The Impact of Information Technology on Diplomacy,” Institute of Diplomacy and Foreign Affairs, Malaysian Ministry for Foreign Affairs, Kuala Lumpur, August 1996.
- “Information Technology and the Dynamics of Diplomacy,” Institute of Foreign Affairs, Ministry for Foreign Affairs, Bangkok, Thailand, August 1996.
- “Information Technology, the Media, and Diplomacy,” the Diplomatic Institute of Education and Training, Indonesian Ministry for Foreign Affairs, Jakarta, November 1996.
- “The Impact of the Information Revolution on the Organisation of the Ministry for Foreign Affairs and Diplomatic Practice,” Ministry for Foreign Affairs, Doha, Qatar, July 1997.
- “International Security “, the German Foundation of International Development, Foreign Ministry, Berlin, February 2000. Participated in a simulation exercise on the UN and Water Resources Disputes.

== Sources ==
- http://www.globaldiplomaticacademy.com/bio.htm
- http://nabilayad-geodiplomatics.com/lad.htm
- https://culture-multicultures.blogspot.com/2010/11/interview-with-mr-nabil-ayad.html
- Biography at the Commission on Globalisation Conference
