= List of biologists =

This is a list of notable biologists with a biography in Wikipedia. It includes zoologists, botanists, biochemists, ornithologists, entomologists, malacologists, and other specialities.

== A ==
=== Ab–Ag ===
- John Jacob Abel (1857–1938), American biochemist and pharmacologist, founder of the first department of pharmacology in the United States.
- John Abelson (born 1938), American biologist with expertise in biophysics, biochemistry, and genetics
- Michael Abercrombie FRS (1912–1979), British cell biologist and embryologist
- Richard J. Ablin (born 1940), American immunologist. Research on prostate cancer. Discovered prostate-specific antigen (PSA) which led to the development of the PSA test
- Erik Acharius (1757–1819), Swedish botanist who studied lichens
- Gary Ackers (1939–2011), American biophysicist who worked on thermodynamics of macromolecules.
- Gilbert Smithson Adair (1896–1979), British protein chemist who identified cooperative binding of oxygen binding haemoglobin.
- Arthur Adams (1820–1878), English physician and naturalist who classified crustaceans and molluscs
- Michel Adanson (1727–1806), French naturalist who studied the plants and animals of Senegal
- Julius Adler (1930–2024), American biochemist and geneticist known for work on chemotaxis.
- Monique Adolphe (1932–2022), French cell biologist, pioneer of cell culture
- Edgar Douglas Adrian (1st Baron Adrian) (1889–1977), British electrophysiologist, Nobel Prize in Physiology or Medicine (1932) for research on neurons
- Adam Afzelius (1750–1837), Swedish botanist who collected botanical specimens later acquired by Uppsala University
- Carl Adolph Agardh (1785–1859), Swedish botanist who classified plant orders and classes
- Jacob Georg Agardh (1813–1901), Swedish botanist known for classification of algae
- Louis Agassiz (1807–1873), Swiss zoologist who studied the classification of fish; opponent of natural selection
- Alexander Agassiz (1835–1910), American zoologist, son of Louis Agassiz, expert of marine biology and on mining
- Nikolaus Ager (also Nicolas Ager, Agerius) (1568–1634), French botanist, author of De Anima Vegetativa

=== Ai–An ===
- Nagima Aitkhozhina (1946–2020), Kazakh molecular biologist, structural and functional organisation of the genome of higher organisms and the molecular mechanisms of regulation of its expression.
- William Aiton (1731–1793), Scottish botanist, director of the botanical garden at Kew
- Igor Akimushkin (1929–1993), Soviet zoologist
- Bruce Alberts (born 1938), American biochemist, former President of the United States National Academy of Sciences, known for studying the protein complexes involved in chromosome replication, and for the book Molecular Biology of the Cell
- Robert Alberty (1921–2014), American physical biochemist, with many contributions to enzyme kinetics
- Edmond Albius (c. 1829–1880) Réunionais horticulturalist, born in slavery, who introduced hand pollination of vanilla
- Alfred William Alcock (1859–1933), British systematist of numerous species, aspects of biology and physiology of fishes
- Nora Lilian Alcock (1874–1972), British pioneer in plant pathology who did research on fungal diseases
- Boyd Alexander (1873–1910), English ornithologist who made surveys of birds in the Gold Coast (now Ghana), and the Bonin Islands
- Richard D. Alexander (1929–2018), American evolutionary biologist whose scientific pursuits integrated systematics, ecology, evolution, natural history and behaviour
- Salim Ali (1896–1987), Indian ornithologist who conducted systematic bird surveys across India
- Frédéric-Louis Allamand (1736–1809), Swiss botanist who described several plant genera
- Warder Clyde Allee (1885–1955), American zoologist and ecologist, identified the Allee effect (correlation between population density and individual fitness)
- Joel Asaph Allen (1838–1921), American zoologist who studied birds and mammals, known for Allen's rule
- Jorge Allende (born 1934), Chilean biochemist known for contributions to the understanding of protein biosynthesis
- George James Allman (1812–1898), British naturalist who did important work on the gymnoblasts
- June Dalziel Almeida (1930–2007), Scottish virologist who pioneered techniques for characterizing viruses, and discovered Coronavirus
- Tikvah Alper (1909–1995), South African radiobiologist who showed that the infectious agent of scrapie contains no nucleic acid
- Prospero Alpini (1553–1617), Italian botanist, the first in Europe to describe coffee and banana plants
- Sidney Altman (1939–2022), Canadian-born molecular biologist, winner of the 1989 Nobel Prize in Chemistry for his work on RNA
- Pyotr Anokhin (1898–1974), Soviet biologist and physiologist, known for his theory of functional systems and the concept of systemogenesis

=== Am–As ===
- Bruce Ames (1928–2024), American biochemist, inventor of the Ames test for mutagenicity (sometimes regarded as a test for carcinogenicity)
- John E. Amoore (1939–1998), British biochemist and zoologist, originator of the stereochemical theory of olfaction.
- José Alberto de Oliveira Anchieta (1832–1897), Portuguese naturalist who identified many new species of mammals, birds, amphibians and reptiles
- Mortimer Louis Anson (1901–1968), American biochemist and protein chemist who proposed that protein folding was reversible
- Jakob Johan Adolf Appellöf (1857–1921), Swedish marine zoologist who made important contributions to knowledge of cephalopods
- Agnes Robertson Arber (1879–1960), British plant morphologist and anatomist, historian of botany and philosopher of biology
- Aristotle (384 BC–322 BC), Greek philosopher, sometimes regarded as the first biologist, he described hundreds of kinds of animals
- Emily Arnesen (1867–1928), Norwegian zoologist who worked on sponges
- Frances Arnold (born 1956), American biochemist and biochemical engineer, pioneer of the use of directed evolution to engineer enzymes.
- Ruth Arnon (born 1933), Israeli biochemist, who works on anti-cancer and influenza vaccinations. She participated in developing the multiple sclerosis drug Copaxone.
- Peter Artedi (1705–1735), Swedish naturalist who developed the science of ichthyology
- Gilbert Ashwell (1916–2014), American biochemist, pioneer in the study of cell receptor
- Ana Aslan (1897–1988), Romanian biologist who studied arthritis and other aspects of aging
- Boris Astaurov (1904–1974), Soviet biologist and geneticist who worked on breeding experiments including pioneering work on silkworms
- William Astbury (1898–1961), British physicist, molecular biologist and X-ray crystallographer

=== At–Az ===
- David Attenborough (born 1926), British natural history broadcaster
- Jean Baptiste Audebert (1759–1800), French naturalist. Primarily an artist, he illustrated books of natural history, including Histoire naturelle des singes, des makis [lemurs] et des galéopithèques
- Jean Victoire Audouin (1797–1841), French zoologist: entomologist, herpetologist, ornithologist and malacologist
- John James Audubon (1786–1851), French and American ornithologist and illustrator, who identified 25 new species
- Charlotte Auerbach (1899–1994), German and British geneticist, founded the discipline of mutagenesis after discovering the effect of mustard gas on fruit flies
- Caroline Austin (20th–21st century), British molecular biologist known for her work on human DNA topoisomerase enzymes
- Richard Axel (born 1946), American Nobel Prize–winning physiologist who discovered how to insert foreign DNA into a host cell
- Julius Axelrod (1912–2004), American biochemist, winner of the 1970 Nobel Prize in Physiology or Medicine for his research on catecholamine neurotransmitters
- Francisco Ayala (1934–2023), Spanish-American evolutionary biologist and philosopher
- William Orville Ayres (1817–1887), American physician and ichthyologist with publications in popular sources
- Félix de Azara (1746–1811), Spanish naturalist who described more than 350 South American birds

== B ==
=== Ba ===
- Charles Cardale Babington (1808–1895), British botanist and archaeologist
- Churchill Babington (1821–1889), British classical scholar, archaeologist and botanist
- John Bachman (1790–1874), American ornithologist; also one of the first scientists to argue that blacks and whites are the same species
- Curt Backeberg (1894–1966), German horticulturist, known for classification of cacti
- Karl Ernst von Baer (1792–1876), German naturalist (in Estonia), biologist, geologist, meteorologist, geographer, and a founding father of embryology
- Liberty Hyde Bailey (1858–1954), American botanist, one of the first to recognize the importance of Gregor Mendel's work
- Donna Baird (thesis 1980), American epidemiologist and evolutionary-population biologist, concerned with women's health
- Spencer Fullerton Baird (1823–1887), American naturalist, ornithologist, ichthyologist and herpetologist who collected and classified many species
- Scott Baker (born 1954), American marine biologist, cetacean expert
- John Hutton Balfour (1808–1884), Scottish botanist, author of numerous books, including Manual of Botany
- Clinton Ballou (1923–2021), American biochemist who worked on the metabolism of carbohydrates and the structures of microbial cell walls
- Henri Heim de Balsac (1899–1979), French zoologist known for work on ethology
- David Baltimore (1938–2025), American biologist, known for work on viruses. Nobel Prize in Physiology or Medicine 1975
- Outram Bangs (1863–1932), American zoologist who collected many bird species; author of more than 70 books and articles, 55 of them on mammals
- Joseph Banks (1743–1820), English naturalist, botanist who collected 30,000 plant specimens and discovered 1,400.
- Robert Bárány (1876–1936), Austro-Hungarian (later Swedish) physician. Nobel Prize in Physiology or Medicine (1914) for studies of the vestibular system
- Horace Barker (1907–2000), American biochemist and microbiologist
- Ben Barres (1954–2017), American neurobiologist who studied mammalian glial cells of the central nervous system
- Aleksandr Bartenev (1882–1946), Russian and Soviet zoologist, professor, Doctor of Biological Sciences, and Rector of Rostov University in 1920–1921
- Ewa Bartnik (born 1949), Polish biologist and university professor
- Benjamin Smith Barton (1766–1815), American botanist, author of Elements of botany, or Outlines of the natural history of vegetables, the first American textbook of botany
- John Bartram (1699–1777), American botanist, described by Carl Linnaeus as the "greatest natural botanist in the world"
- William Bartram (1739–1823), American botanist, ornithologist, natural historian, and explorer, author of Bartram's Travels (as now known)
- Anton de Bary (1831–1888), German surgeon, botanist, microbiologist, and mycologist, considered a founding father of plant pathology (phytopathology) as well as the founder of modern mycology
- Dorothea Bate (1878–1951), Welsh palaeontologist and pioneer of archaeozoology who studied fossils
- Henry Walter Bates (1825–1892), English naturalist who gave the first scientific account of mimicry
- Patrick Bateson (1938–2017), English biologist and science writer, president of the Zoological Society of London
- August Johann Georg Karl Batsch (1762–1802), German botanist, mycologist who discovered almost 200 species of mushrooms
- Gaspard Bauhin (1560–1624), Swiss botanist who introduced binomial nomenclature into taxonomy, foreshadowing Linnaeus

=== Be–Bi ===
- George Beadle (1903–1989), American geneticist. Nobel Prize in Physiology or Medicine 1958 for discovery of the role of genes in regulating biochemical reactions within cells. 7th president of the University of Chicago.
- Johann Matthäus Bechstein (1757–1822), German naturalist, ornithologist, entomologist and herpetologist known for his treatise on singing birds Naturgeschichte der Stubenvögel
- Rollo Beck (1870–1950), American ornithologist known for collecting birds and reptiles, including three of the last four individuals of the Pinta Island tortoise
- Jon Beckwith (born 1935), American microbiologist and geneticist who worked on bacterial genetics.
- Charles William Beebe (1877–1962), American biologist, known for work on pheasants, and numerous books on natural history
- Martinus Beijerinck (1851–1931), Dutch microbiologist and botanist who discovered viruses and investigated nitrogen fixation by bacteria
- Helmut Beinert (1913–2007), German-American biochemist, a pioneer of the use of electron paramagnetic resonance in biological systems
- Chase Beisel (PhD 2009), German professor of synthetic RNA biology at Julius-Maximilians-Universität Würzburg
- Thomas Bell (1792–1880), English zoologist, surgeon and writer who described and classified Darwin's reptile specimens and crustaceans
- David Bellamy (1933–2019), English broadcaster, activist and ecologist
- Boris Pavlovich Belousov (1893–1970), Soviet chemist and biophysicist who discovered the Belousov–Zhabotinsky reaction
- Andrey Belozersky (1905–1972), Soviet biologist and biochemist, one of the pioneers of molecular biology studies and who obtained the first evidence of the existence of mRNA and laid the foundations of genosystematics
- Stephen J. Benkovic (born 1938), American bioorganic chemist specializing in mechanistic enzymology
- Edward Turner Bennett (1797–1836), English zoologist who described a new species of African crocodile
- John Joseph Bennett (1801–1876), British physician and botanist
- George Bentham (1800–1884), English botanist, known for his taxonomy of plants, written with Joseph Dalton Hooker, Genera Plantarum
- Jacques Benoit (1896–1982), French biologist, physician. One of the pioneers of neuroendocrinology and photobiology.
- Robert Bentley (1821–1893), English botanist, known for Medicinal Plants (four volumes)
- Wilson Teixeira Beraldo (1917–1998), Brazilian physician and physiologist, co-discoverer of bradykinin
- Paul Berg (1926–2023), American biochemist known for work on gene splicing of recombinant DNA.
- Hans Berger (1873–1941), German neuroscientist, one of the founders of electroencephalography
- Carl Bergmann (1814–1865), German anatomist, physiologist and biologist who developed Bergmann's rule relating population and body sizes with ambient temperature
- Rudolph Bergh (1824–1909), Danish physician and zoologist who studied sexually transmitted diseases, and also molluscs
- J. D. Bernal (1901–1971), Irish molecular biologist who pioneered the use of X-ray crystallography
- Claude Bernard (1813–1878), French physiologist, father of the concepts of the milieu intérieur and homeostasis
- Samuel Stillman Berry (1887–1984), American zoologist who established 401 mollusc taxa, and worked on chitons, cephalopods, and also land snails
- Thomas Bewick (1753–1828), English ornithologist and illustrator, author of A General History of Quadrupeds
- Gabriel Bibron (1806–1848), French zoologist, expert on reptiles and author (with André Marie Constant Duméril) of Erpétologie Générale
- Klaus Biemann (1926–2016), Austrian chemist, the "father of organic mass spectrometry"
- Ann Bishop (1899–1990), English biologist who specialized in protozoology and parasitology
- J. Michael Bishop (1936–2026), American immunologist and microbiologist who shared the 1989 Nobel Prize in Physiology or Medicine
- Biswamoy Biswas (1923–1994), Indian ornithologist who studied, in particular, the birds of Nepal and Bhutan

=== Bl–Bo ===
- Elizabeth Blackburn (born 1948), Australian/US Nobel Prize–winning researcher in the field of telomeres and the "telomerase" enzyme
- John Blackwall (1790–1881), British entomologist, author of A History of the Spiders of Great Britain and Ireland
- Henri Marie Ducrotay de Blainville (1777–1850), French zoologist, taxonomic authority on numerous zoological species, including Blainville's beaked whale
- Albert Francis Blakeslee (1874–1954), American botanist, best known for research on Jimsonweed and the sexuality of fungi
- Thomas Blakiston (1832–1891), English naturalist. "Blakiston's Line" separates animal species of Hokkaidō and northern Asia, from those of Honshū and southern Asia.
- Frank Nelson Blanchard (1888–1937), American herpetologist who described new subspecies of snakes.
- Frjeda Blanchard (1889–1977), American plant and animal geneticist who demonstrated Mendelian inheritance in reptiles.
- William Thomas Blanford (1832–1905), English geologist and naturalist, editor of The Fauna of British India, Including Ceylon and Burma.
- Pieter Bleeker (1819–1878), Dutch ichthyologist whose papers described 511 new genera and 1,925 new species
- Günter Blobel (1936–2018), German Nobel Prize-winning biologist who discovered that newly synthesized proteins contain "address tags" which direct them to the proper location within the cell
- Konrad Emil Bloch (1912–2000), German-American biochemist who worked on cholesterol and fatty acid metabolism
- Steven Block (born 1952), American biophysicist who measured the mechanical properties of single bio-molecules
- David Mervyn Blow (1931–2004), British X-ray crystallographer noted for work on protein structure
- Carl Ludwig Blume (Karel Lodewijk Blume, 1789–1862), German-Dutch botanist who studied the flora of southern Asia, particularly Java
- Johann Friedrich Blumenbach (1752–1840), German physiologist and anthropologist who classified human races on the basis of skull structure
- Edward Blyth (1810–1873), English zoologist who classified many birds of India
- José Vicente Barbosa du Bocage (1823–1907), Portuguese zoologist with many papers on mammals, birds, reptiles, amphibians, fishes, and others
- Pieter Boddaert (1730–1795/1796), Dutch physician and naturalist who named many mammals, birds and other animals
- Brendan J. M. Bohannan (PhD 1997), American microbial and evolutionary biologist, expert on the microbes of Amazonia
- Charles Lucien Bonaparte (1803–1857), French naturalist who coined Latin names for many bird species
- James Bond (1900–1989), American ornithologist, author of Birds of the West Indies
- Franco Andrea Bonelli (1784–1830), Italian ornithologist, author of a Catalogue of the Birds of Piedmont, which described 262 species
- August Gustav Heinrich von Bongard (1786–1839), German botanist in St Petersburg, one of the first botanists to describe the plants of Alaska
- John Tyler Bonner (1920–2019), American developmental biologist, expert on slime moulds
- Charles Bonnet (1720–1793), Genevan naturalist who published work on many subjects, including insects and plants
- Aimé Bonpland (1773–1858), French explorer and botanist who collected and classified about 6,000 plants unknown in Europe
- Jules Bordet (1870–1961), Belgian immunologist and microbiologist, winner of the 1919 Nobel Prize in Physiology or Medicine for his discovery of the complement system in the immune system
- Antonina Georgievna Borissova (1903–1970), Russian botanist who specialized on the flora of the deserts and semi-desert of central Asia
- Norman Borlaug (1914–2009), American agricultural scientist, humanitarian, Nobel Peace Prize, and the father of the Green Revolution
- Louis Augustin Guillaume Bosc (1759–1828), French botanist, invertebrate zoologist, and entomologist, who made a systematic examination of the mushrooms of the southern United States
- Edward George Boulenger (1888–1946) British zoologist and director of the London Zoo aquarium
- George Albert Boulenger (1858–1937), Belgian and British zoologist, author of 19 monographs on fishes, amphibians, and reptiles
- Jules Bourcier (1797–1873), French ornithologist, expert on hummingbirds
- Paul D. Boyer (1918–2018), American biochemist who was awarded the Nobel Prize in 1997 for studies of ATP synthase

=== Br–Bro ===
- Margaret Bradshaw (born 1941), New Zealand Antarctic researcher who has worked on Devonian invertebrate palaeontology
- Johann Friedrich von Brandt (1802–1879), German-Russian naturalist who described various birds; also an entomologist, specialising in beetles and millipedes
- Sara Branham Matthews (1888–1962), American microbiologist and physician best known for her research into the isolation and treatment of Neisseria meningitidis
- Christian Ludwig Brehm (1787–1864), German ornithologist who described many German species of birds
- Alfred Brehm (1829–1884), German zoologist, author of many works on animals and especially birds
- Sydney Brenner (1927–2019), British molecular biologist who worked on the genetic code, and later established the roundworm Caenorhabditis elegans as a model organism for developmental biology. Nobel Prize in Physiology or Medicine (2002)
- Roger Brent (born 1955), American biologist known for studying gene regulation and systems biology
- Thomas Mayo Brewer (1814–1880), American naturalist, specializing in ornithology and oology (the study of birds' eggs)
- William Brewster (1851–1919), American ornithologist, curator of mammals and birds at Harvard.
- Mathurin Jacques Brisson (1723–1806), French zoologist, author of Le Règne animal and Ornithologie
- Nathaniel Lord Britton (1859–1934), American botanist, coauthor of Illustrated Flora of the Northern United States, Canada, and the British Possessions
- Thomas D. Brock (1926–2021), American microbiologist who discovered of hyperthermophiles such as Thermus aquaticus
- Adolphe Theodore Brongniart (1801–1876), French botanist, author of many works, including Histoire des végétaux fossiles
- Robert Broom (1866–1951), South African paleontologist, author many many papers and books, including The mammal-like reptiles of South Africa and the origin of mammals
- Adrian John Brown (1852–1920), British expert on brewing and malting, pioneer of enzyme kinetics
- James H. Brown (born 1942), American ecologist known for his metabolic theory of ecology
- Patrick O. Brown (born 1954), American biochemist who has developed experimental methods with DNA microarrays to investigate genome organization
- Robert Brown (1773–1858), Scottish botanist known for pioneering use of the microscope in botany

=== Bru–Bu ===
- David Bruce (1855–1931), Scottish pathologist and microbiologist who investigated Malta fever (now called brucellosis) and discovered trypanosomes
- Jean Guillaume Bruguière (1750–1798), French naturalist, mainly interested in molluscs and other invertebrates
- Thomas Bruice (1925–2019), American bioorganic chemist, pioneer of chemical biology
- Sergei Brukhonenko (1890–1960), Soviet physician, biomedical scientist and technologist remembered for his development of the autojektor, one of the first heart and lung machines
- Morten Thrane Brünnich (1737–1827), Danish zoologist, author of Ornithologia Borealis and Ichthyologia Massiliensis
- Francis Buchanan-Hamilton (1762–1829), Scottish zoologist and botanist who studied plants and fishes in India
- Marcel Bucher (born 1964), Swiss plant scientist and professor of Molecular Plant Physiology
- Eduard Buchner (1860–1917), German chemist and physiologist who overthrew the doctrine of vitalism by showing that fermentation occurred in cell-free extracts of yeast
- Linda B. Buck (born 1947), American physiologist noted for work on the olfactory system. Nobel Prize in Physiology or Medicine (2004).
- Buffon (Georges-Louis Leclerc, Comte de Buffon, 1707–1788), French naturalist. Author of many works in evolution, including Histoire naturelle, générale et particulière.
- Walter Buller (1838–1906), New Zealand ornithologist. Author of A History of the Birds of New Zealand.
- Alexander G. von Bunge (1803–1890), German-Russian botanist who studied Mongolian flora.
- Luther Burbank (1849–1926), American horticulturalist who developed more than 800 strains and varieties of plants, many of commercial importance
- Hermann Burmeister (1807–1892), German Argentinian zoologist, entomologist, herpetologist, and botanist, who described many new species of amphibians and reptiles
- Frank Macfarlane Burnet (1899–1985), Australian virologist. Nobel Prize in 1960 for predicting acquired immune tolerance and for developing the theory of clonal selection.
- Carolyn Burns (born 1942), New Zealand ecologist who studies the physiology and population dynamics of southern hemisphere zooplankton and food-web interactions
- Robert H. Burris (1914–2010), American biochemist, expert on nitrogen fixation
- Carlos Bustamante (born 1951), Peruvian-American biophysicist who uses "molecular tweezers" to manipulate DNA for biochemical experiments
- Ernesto Bustamante (born 1950), Peruvian biochemist, specialist in mitochondria demonstrated the importance of mitochondrial hexokinase in glycolysis in rapidly growing malignant tumour cells. He currently works on DNA paternity testing

== C ==
=== Ca ===
- Jean Cabanis (1816–1906), German ornithologist, founder of the Journal für Ornithologie
- Ángel Cabrera (1879–1960), Spanish zoologist, author of South American Mammals
- Ángel Lulio Cabrera (1908–1999), Argentine botanist
- George Caley (1770–1829), English explorer and botanist, discoverer of Mount Banks, Australia
- Rudolf Jakob Camerarius (1665–1721), German botanist, chiefly known for studies of the reproductive organs of plants
- Augustin Pyramus de Candolle (1778–1841), Swiss botanist who documented many plant families and created a new plant classification system
- Charles Cantor (born 1942), American biophysicist, known for pulse field gel electrophoresis, and as Director of the Human Genome Project
- María Luz Cárdenas (born 1944). French biochemist of Chilean origin at the CNRS, Marseille, known for work on mammalian hexokinases.
- Elizabeth P. Carpenter (21st century), British structural biologist, professor
- Philip Pearsall Carpenter (1819–1877), British conchologist, author of Catalogue of the collection of Mazatlan shells, in the British Museum: collected by Frederick Reigen
- Alexis Carrel (1873–1944), French biologist and surgeon, winner of the 1912 Nobel Prize in Physiology or Medicine for his work on sutures and organ transplants, advocate of eugenics
- Elie-Abel Carrière (1818–1896), French botanist, an authority on conifers who described many new species
- Clodoveo Carrión Mora (1883–1957), Ecuadorian paleontologist and naturalist who discovered many species and one genus
- Sean B. Carroll (born 1960), American evolutionary development biologist, author of The Making of the Fittest: DNA and the Ultimate Forensic Record of Evolution and other books
- Rachel Carson (1907–1964), American marine biologist, author of Silent Spring
- George Washington Carver (1860–1943), American agriculturist, author of bulletins on crop production, including How to Grow the Peanut and 105 Ways of Preparing it for Human Consumption
- John Cassin (1813–1869), American ornithologist, who named many birds not described in the works of his predecessors
- Alexandre de Cassini (1781–1832), French botanist who named many flowering plants and new genera in the sunflower family, many of them from North America
- Amy Castle (1880–1971), New Zealand entomologist, who worked primarily on the Lepidoptera
- William E. Castle (1867–1962), American geneticist who contributed to the mathematical foundations of Mendelian genetics, and anticipated what is now known as the Hardy–Weinberg law.
- Mark Catesby (1683–1749), English naturalist who studied flora and fauna in the New World. Author of Natural History of Carolina, Florida and the Bahama Islands

=== Ce–Ch ===
- Thomas Cech (born 1947), American biochemist who discovered catalytic RNA, Nobel Prize in 1989
- Andrea Cesalpino (1519–1603), Italian botanist who classified plants according to their fruits and seeds, rather than alphabetically or by medicinal properties
- Francesco Cetti (1726–1778), Italian zoologist, author of Storia Naturale di Sardegna (Natural History of Sardinia)
- Carlos Chagas (1879–1934), Brazilian physician who identified Trypanosoma cruzi as cause of Chagas disease
- Adelbert von Chamisso (Louis Charles Adélaïde de Chamissot, 1781–1838), German botanist, whose most important contribution was the description of many Mexican trees
- Juliana Chan (PhD 2010), Singaporean biologist and science communicator
- Britton Chance (1913–2010), American biochemist, inventor of the stopped-flow method
- Min Chueh Chang (1908–1991), Chinese-American reproductive biologist who studied the fertilisation process in mammalian reproduction, with work that led to the first test tube baby
- Jean-Pierre Changeux (born 1936), French biochemist and neuroscientist, originator of the allosteric model of cooperativity
- Frank Michler Chapman (1864–1945), American ornithologist, who promoted the use of photography in ornithology, especially in his book Bird Studies With a Camera.
- Erwin Chargaff (1905–2002), Austrian-American biochemist known for Chargaff's rules
- Emmanuelle Charpentier (born 1968), French microbiologist, geneticist and biochemist who discovered genome editing with CRISPR.
- Myriam Charpentier (21st century), British molecular biologist and researcher of nuclear calcium signaling
- Martha Chase (1927–2003), American biologist who carried out the Hershey–Chase experiment, which showed that genetic information is held and transmitted by DNA, not by protein
- Thomas Frederic Cheeseman (1846–1923), New Zealand botanist and naturalist with wide-ranging interests, including sea slugs
- Sergei Chetverikov (1880–1959), Russian population geneticist who showed how early genetic theories applied to natural populations, and thus contributed towards the modern synthesis of evolutionary theory
- Charles Chilton (1860–1929), New Zealand zoologist with 130 papers on crustaceans, mostly amphipods, isopods and decapods, from all around the world, but especially from New Zealand
- Carl Chun (1852–1914), German marine biologist specializing in cephalopods and plankton. He discovered and named the vampire squid
- Aaron Ciechanover (born 1947). Israeli biochemist known for work on protein turnover, for which he was awarded the Nobel Prize in 2004

=== Cl–Co ===
- Albert Claude (1899–1983), Belgian-American cell biologist who developed cell fractionation; Nobel Prize 1974
- W. Wallace Cleland (1930–2013). American biochemist known for work on enzyme kinetics and mechanism
- Nathan Cobb (1859–1932), American biologist who described over 1000 different nematode species and laid the foundations of nematode taxonomy
- Leonard Cockayne (1855–1934), New Zealand botanist especially active in plant ecology and theories of hybridisation
- Alfred Cogniaux (1841–1916), Belgian botanist who worked especially with orchids
- Stanley Cohen (1922–2020), American biochemist, Nobel Prize in Physiology or Medicine (1986) for his discovery of growth factors
- Edwin Joseph Cohn (1892–1953), American protein chemist known for studies on blood and the physical chemistry of protein
- Mildred Cohn (1913–2009), American pioneer in the use of nuclear magnetic resonance to study enzymes
- James J. Collins (born 1965), American biologist, synthetic biology and systems biology pioneer
- Timothy Abbott Conrad (1803–1877), American paleontologist and naturalist who studied the shells of the Tertiary and Cretaceous formations, as well as existing species of molluscs
- James Graham Cooper (1830–1902), American surgeon and naturalist who contributed to both zoology and botany
- William Cooper (1798–1864), American naturalist and conchologist
- Edward Drinker Cope (1840–1897), American paleontologist and comparative anatomist, also a herpetologist and ichthyologist, and founder of the Neo-Lamarckism school of thought
- Carl Ferdinand Cori (1896–1984), Czech-American biochemist and pharmacologist, 1947 Nobel Prize in Physiology or Medicine for work on the Cori cycle
- Gerty Cori (1886–1957), Czech-American biochemist, first American woman to win a Nobel Prize in science (Physiology or Medicine, 1947), for unraveling the mechanism of glycogen metabolism
- Charles B. Cory (1857–1921), American ornithologist who collected many birds. Author of The Birds of Haiti and San Domingo and other books.
- Emanuel Mendes da Costa (1717–1791), English botanist, naturalist, philosopher, author of A Natural History of Fossils, British Conchology, and other books
- Elliott Coues (1842–1899), American army surgeon, historian, ornithologist, and author of Key to North American Birds, did much to promote the systematic study of ornithology
- Marjorie Courtenay-Latimer (1907–2004), South African zoologist who discovered the Coelacanth
- Jacques-Yves Cousteau (1910–1997), French naval officer, explorer, conservationist, filmmaker, innovator, scientist, photographer, author and researcher who studied the sea and all forms of life in water
- Miguel Rolando Covian (1913–1992), Argentine-Brazilian neurophysiologist known for research on the neurophysiology of the limbic system, regarded as the father of Brazilian neurophysiology
- Frederick Vernon Coville (1867–1937), American botanist, author of Botany of the Death Valley Expedition
- Jerry Allen Coyne (born 1949), American biologist and skeptic known for his work on speciation and commentary on intelligent design

=== Cr–Cu ===
- Robert K. Crane (1919–2010), American biochemist who discovered sodium–glucose cotransport
- Lucy Cranwell (1907–2000), New Zealand botanist who organized the Cheeseman herbarium of about 10,000 specimens in Auckland
- Philipp Jakob Cretzschmar (1786–1845), German physician and zoologist (especially birds and mammals)
- Francis Crick (1916–2004), British molecular biologist, biophysicist and neuroscientist, best known for discovering the structure of DNA (with James Watson); Nobel Prize 1962
- Joseph Charles Hippolyte Crosse (1826–1898), French conchologist, expert on molluscs, co-editor of the Journal de Conchyliologie
- Nicholas Culpeper (1616–1654), English botanist, author of The English Physitian
- Allan Cunningham (1791–1839), English botanist, "King's Collector for the Royal Garden at Kew" (in Australia)
- Gordon Herriot Cunningham (1892–1962), New Zealand mycologist who published extensively on the taxonomy of fungi
- Richard Cunningham (1793–1835), English botanist, superintendent of the Sydney Botanic Gardens
- Kathleen Curtis (1892–1993), New Zealand mycologist and plant pathologist, a founder of plant pathology in New Zealand
- William Curtis (1746–1799), English botanist, author of Flora Londinensis
- Georges Cuvier (1769–1832), French naturalist, author of Le Règne Animal (the Animal Kingdom), the "founding father of paleontology"

== D ==
=== Da ===
- Valerie Daggett (thesis 1990), American bioengineer who simulates proteins and other biomolecules by molecular dynamics
- Anders Dahl (1751–1789), Swedish botanist whose name is recalled in the Dahlia, author of Observationes botanicae circa systema vegetabilium
- Marie Daiber (1868–1928), German-born Swiss zoologist
- William Healey Dall (1845–1927), American malacologist, one of the earliest scientific explorers of interior Alaska. He described many mollusks of the Pacific Northwest of America
- Keith Dalziel (1921–1994), British biochemist, pioneer in systematizing the kinetics of two-substrate enzyme-catalysed reactions
- Carl Peter Henrik Dam (1895–1976), Danish physiologist who discovered vitamin K
- Marguerite Davis (1887–1967), American biochemist, co-discoverer of vitamins A and B
- Jivanayakam Cyril Daniel (1927–2011), Indian naturalist, director of the Bombay Natural History Society, author of The Book of Indian Reptiles
- Charles Darwin (1809–1882), British naturalist, author of The Origin of Species, in which he expounded the theory of natural selection, the starting point of modern evolutionary biology
- Erasmus Darwin (1731–1802), English physician and naturalist, founding member of the Lunar Society, grandfather of Charles Darwin
- Sir Francis Darwin (1848–1925), British botanist known for work on phototropism
- Jean Dausset (1916–2009), French immunologist who worked on the major histocompatibility complex
- Charles Davenport (1866–1944), American biologist and eugenicist, founded the Eugenics Record Office at Cold Spring Harbor Laboratory
- Gertrude Crotty Davenport (1866–1946), American zoologist prominent in the eugenics movement
- Armand David (Père David) (1826–1900), French zoologist and botanist, commissioned by the Jardin des Plantes to undertake scientific journeys through China
- Bernard Davis (1916–1994), American biologist who worked on microbial physiology and metabolism
- Marian Stamp Dawkins (born 1945), British biologist and ethologist who studied vision in birds and animal signalling
- Richard Dawkins (born 1941), British evolutionary biologist and writer of popular science, author of The Selfish Gene, The Blind Watchmaker, The God Delusion and other influential books
- Margaret Oakley Dayhoff (1925–1983), American biochemist, pioneer in bioinformatics.

=== De–Di ===
- Pierre Antoine Delalande (1787–1823), French naturalist employed by the National Museum of Natural History to collect natural history specimens
- Max Delbrück (1906–1981), German-American physicist and biologist who demonstrated that natural selection acting on random mutations applied to bacteria, one of the creators of molecular biology; Nobel Prize 1969.
- Richard Dell (1920–2002), New Zealand malacologist, author of The Archibenthal Mollusca of New Zealand
- Stefano Delle Chiaje (1794–1860), Italian zoologist, botanist, anatomist and physician who worked on medicinal plants and on the taxonomy of invertebrates
- Nina Demme (1902–1977), Soviet polar explorer, biologist, and ornithologist
- Paul Émile de Puydt (1810–1888), Belgian botanist, author of Les Orchidées, histoire iconographique ..., active in political philosophy as well as botany
- René Louiche Desfontaines (1750–1833), French botanist and ornithologist who collected many plants in Tunisia and Algeria
- Gérard Paul Deshayes (1795–1875), French geologist and conchologist, distinguished for research on mollusc fossils
- Anselme Gaëtan Desmarest (1784–1838), French zoologist, author of Histoire Naturelle des Tangaras, des Manakins et des Todiers (natural history of various birds)
- Margaret Dick (1918–2008), pioneering Australian microbiologist who developed methodology for safe food production
- Ernst Dieffenbach (1811–1855), German naturalist, one of the first scientists to work in New Zealand
- Johann Jacob Dillenius (1684–1747), German botanist who worked in England on rare plants and mosses
- Lewis Weston Dillwyn (1778–1855), British botanist and conchologist, also active in porcelain manufacture and politics, author of The British Confervae, an illustrated study of British freshwater algae
- John T. Dingle (active from 1959) British biologist and rheumatologist.
- Joan Marjorie Dingley (1916–2008), New Zealand mycologist, world authority on fungi and New Zealand plant diseases
- Zacharias Dische (1895–1988), Ukrainian-Jewish-American biochemist who discovered metabolic regulation by feedback inhibition
- Malcolm Dixon (1899–1985), British biochemist, authority on enzyme structure, kinetics, and properties; author (with Edwin Webb) of Enzymes.

=== Do ===
- Walter Dobrogosz (1933–2023), American microbiologist, discoverer of Lactobacillus reuteri
- Theodosius Dobzhansky (1900–1975), American geneticist of Ukrainian origin, one of the leading evolutionary biologists of his time
- Rembert Dodoens (1517–1585), Flemish botanist who classified plants according to their properties and affinities (rather than listing them alphabetically)
- Anton Dohrn (1840–1909), German marine biologist, Darwinist, founder of the world's first zoological research station, in Naples
- Carl August Dohrn (1806–1892), German entomologist who described several species of beetles
- Heinrich Wolfgang Ludwig Dohrn (1838–1913), German zoologist, entomologist, with interests mainly in the Orthoptera and Lepidoptera
- Genrietta Dokhman (1897–1987), Soviet geobiologist and phytocenologist
- David Don (1799–1841), British botanist who described major conifers discovered in his time, including the Coast Redwood
- George Don (1798–1856), British botanist known for his four-volume A General System of Gardening and Botany
- Franciscus Cornelis Donders (1818–1889) Dutch ophthalmologist, authority on eye diseases
- James Donn (1758–1813), English botanist, curator of the Cambridge University Botanic Gardens, and author of Hortus Cantabrigiensis
- Jean Dorst (1924–2001), French ornithologist, authority on bird migration and one of the writers of Le Peuple Migrateur (Winged Migration)
- Edward Doubleday (1810–1849), British entomologist known for The Genera of Diurnal Lepidoptera
- Henry Doubleday (1808–1875), British entomologist, author of the first catalogue of British butterflies and moths, Synonymic List of the British Lepidoptera
- Jennifer Doudna (born 1964), American biochemist known for CRISPR-mediated genome editing; Nobel Prize 2020
- David Douglas (1799–1834), Scottish botanist who studied conifers. The Douglas-fir is named after him.

=== Du ===
- Patricia Louise Dudley (1929–2004), American zoologist who studied copepods (small crustaceans)
- Peter Duesberg (1936–2026), German-American virologist who discovered the first retrovirus, and expert on genetic aspects of cancer, but his research contributions are overshadowed by his unpopular views on AIDS
- Félix Dujardin (1802–1860), French zoologist who studied protozoans, and also the structure of the insect brain
- Renato Dulbecco (1914–2012), Italian-American virologist awarded the Nobel Prize for work on oncoviruses
- Ronald Duman (1954–2020), American neuroscientist whose work in biological psychiatry concerned the biological mechanisms behind antidepressants
- André Marie Constant Duméril (1774–1860), French zoologist at the Muséum national d'histoire naturelle, who worked on herpetology and ichthyology
- Auguste Duméril (1812–1870), French zoologist, professor of herpetology and ichthyology, noted for Catalogue méthodique de la collection des Reptiles
- Charles Dumont de Sainte-Croix (1758–1830), French lawyer, but also an amateur ornithologist who described a number of Javanese bird species
- Michel Felix Dunal (1789–1856), French botanist known for work on the genus Solanum
- Robin Dunbar (born 1947), British anthropologist and evolutionary psychologist, a specialist in primate behaviour.
- Gerald Durrell (1925–1995), British naturalist, writer, zookeeper, conservationist, and television presenter, writer of popular books, such as My Family and Other Animals
- Christian de Duve (1917–2013), Belgian cytologist and biochemist, discoverer of peroxisomes and lysosomes

== E ==
=== Ea--El ===
- Sylvia Earle (born 1935), American oceanographer, author of Blue Hope: Exploring and Caring for Earth's Magnificent Ocean
- Lindon Eaves (1944–2022), British geneticist (and priest) known for statistical modelling and the genetics of personality and social attitudes
- John Carew Eccles (1903–1997), Australian neurophysiologist and winner of the 1963 Nobel Prize in Physiology or Medicine for his work on the synapse
- Christian Friedrich Ecklon (1795–1868), Danish botanical collector, particularly of South African plants and apothecary
- Gerald Edelman (1929–2014), American immunologist who discovered the structure of antibodies
- Robert Stuart Edgar (1930– 2016), American geneticist who studied mechanisms of formation of virus particles
- John Tileston Edsall (1902–2002), American protein chemist at Harvard, author of Proteins, Amino Acids and Peptides
- George Edwards (1693–1773), British naturalist, ornithologist and illustrator, author of A Natural History of Uncommon Birds
- Sir Robert Geoffrey Edwards (1925–2013), British physiologist, pioneer in reproductive medicine and in-vitro fertilisation
- Christian Gottfried Ehrenberg (1795–1876), German zoologist, comparative anatomist, geologist, and microscopist
- Paul Ehrlich (1854–1915), German immunologist who discovered the first effective treatment for syphilis
- Karl Eichwald (1795–1876), Baltic German geologist, physician, and naturalist, who described new species of reptiles
- Theodor Eimer (1843–1898), German professor of zoology and comparative anatomy who studied speciation and kinship in butterflies
- George Eliava (1892–1937), Georgian-Soviet microbiologist who worked with bacteriophages (viruses that infect bacteria)
- Gertrude B. Elion (1918–1999), American pharmacologist known for using rational drug design for the discovery of new drugs
- Daniel Giraud Elliot (1835–1915), American zoologist, founder of the American Ornithologist Union
- Gladys Anderson Emerson (1903–1984), American historian and nutritionist, the first to isolate pure Vitamin E

=== En--Ey ===
- Günther Enderlein (1872–1968), German zoologist, entomologist, microbiologist, physician and manufacturer of pharmaceutical products
- Stephan Ladislaus Endlicher (1804–1849), Austrian botanist, numismatist and Sinologist, director of the Botanical Garden of Vienna
- Michael S. Engel (born 1971), American paleontologist and entomologist who works on insect evolutionary biology and classification
- George Engelmann (1809–1884), German-American botanist who described the flora of the west of North America
- Adolf Engler (1844–1930), German botanist who worked on plant taxonomy and phytogeography, author of Die natürlichen Pflanzenfamilien
- Gennady Ermak (born 1963), Soviet molecular biologist
- Johann Christian Polycarp Erxleben (1744–1777), German naturalist, author of Anfangsgründe der Naturlehre and Systema regni animalis, founder of the first academic veterinary school in Germany
- Johann Friedrich von Eschscholtz (1793–1831), Baltic German biologist and explorer. The Latin name (Eschscholtzia californica) of the California poppy commemorates him
- Constantin von Ettingshausen (1826–1897), Austrian botanist known for his palaeobotanical studies of flora from the Tertiary era
- Alice Catherine Evans (1881–1975), American microbiologist who demonstrated that Bacillus abortus caused the disease brucellosis (undulant fever or Malta fever) in both cattle and humans
- Warren Ewens (born 1937), Australian-American mathematical population geneticist working on the mathematical, statistical and theoretical aspects of population genetics
- Thomas Campbell Eyton (1809–1880), English naturalist who studied cattle, fishes and birds, author of History of the Rarer British Birds

== F ==
=== Fa–Fe ===
- Jean Henri Fabre (1823–1915), French teacher, physicist, chemist and botanist, best known for the study of insects
- Kurt Fabri (1923–1990), Austrian-born Soviet biologist and professor at Moscow State University who contributed to the scientific study of animal behavior
- Johan Christian Fabricius (1745–1808), Danish entomologist who named nearly 10,000 species of animals, and established the basis of insect classification.
- David Fairchild (1869–1954), American botanist who introduced many exotic plants into the USA
- Hugh Falconer (1808–1865), Scottish geologist, botanist, palaeontologist, and paleoanthropologist who studied the flora, fauna, and geology of India, Assam, and Burma
- John Farrah (1849–1907), English businessman and amateur biologist
- Leonardo Fea (1852–1903), Italian zoologist who made large collections of insects and birds
- Christoph Feldegg (1780–1845), Austrian naturalist who made a large collection of birds
- David Fell (born 1947), British biochemist and pioneer of systems biology, author of Understanding the Control of Metabolism
- Honor Fell (1900–1986), British zoologist who developed tissue and organ culture methods
- Sérgio Ferreira (1934–2016), Brazilian pharmacologist who discovered bradykinin potentiating factor, important for anti-hypertension drugs
- Alan Fersht (born 1943), British chemist and biochemist, expert on enzymes and protein folding

=== Fi–Fl ===
- Harold John Finlay (1901–1951), New Zealand paleontologist and conchologist known for work on marine malacofauna of New Zealand
- Otto Finsch (1839–1917), German ethnographer, naturalist and colonial explorer, known for a monograph on parrots
- Edmond H. Fischer (1920–2021), Swiss-American biochemist known for protein kinases and phosphatases; Nobel Prize 1992
- Johann Fischer von Waldheim (1771–1853), German entomologist known for the classification of invertebrates
- Paul Henri Fischer (1835–1893), French physician, zoologist, malacologist and paleontologist
- James Fisher (1922–1970), English author, editor, broadcaster, naturalist and ornithologist
- Ronald Fisher (1890–1962), British biologist and statistician, one of the founders of population genetics
- Walter Monroe Fitch (1929–2011), pioneering American researcher in molecular evolution
- Leopold Fitzinger (1802–1884), Austrian zoologist known for classification of reptiles
- Tim Flannery (born 1956), Australian biologist who has discovered numerous species of mammals
- Alexander Fleming (1881–1955), British physician and microbiologist who discovered penicillin; Nobel Prize 1945
- Charles Fleming (1916–1987), New Zealand ornithologist, palaeontologist
- Walther Flemming (1843–1905), German physician and anatomist, discoverer of mitosis and chromosomes
- Thomas Bainbrigge Fletcher (1878–1950), English officer in the Royal Navy, and an amateur lepidopterist who became an expert on microlepidoptera
- Louis B. Flexner (1902–1996), American biochemist who worked on memory and brain function
- Howard Walter Florey (1898–1968), Australian pharmacologist who was the co-inventor of penicillin; Nobel Prize 1945

=== Fo–Fu ===
- Otto Folin (1867–1934), Swedish-American chemist who developed methods for analysing protein-free blood filtrates
- E. B. Ford (1901–1988), British ecological geneticist who studied the genetics of natural populations, and invented the field of ecological genetics
- Margot Forde (1935–1992), New Zealand botanist who studied plant taxonomies of Inner Mongolia, Xinjiang and the Caucasus
- William Forsyth (1737–1804), Scottish botanist, royal head gardener and a founding member of the Royal Horticultural Society
- Peter Forsskål (1732–1763), Finnish explorer, orientalist, naturalist, and an apostle of Carl Linnaeus
- Georg Forster (1754–1794), German naturalist, ethnologist, travel writer, journalist and revolutionary
- Peter Forster (born 1967), German geneticist researching human origins and ancestry, and prehistoric languages
- Johann Reinhold Forster (1729–1798), German naturalist and ornithologist, the naturalist on James Cook's second Pacific voyage,
- Robert Fortune (1813–1880), Scottish botanist and plant hunter who introduced many ornamental plants to Britain, Australia and the USA
- Dian Fossey (1932–1985), American zoologist, one of the world's foremost primatologists
- Ruth Fowler Edwards (1930–2013), British geneticist who studied effects of sex hormones on pregnancy and embryonic mortality in mice
- Heinz Fraenkel-Conrat (1910–1999), German-American biochemist and virologist who studied tobacco mosaic virus
- Rosalind Franklin (1920–1958), British x-ray crystallographer whose contributed to the discovery of the structure of DNA
- Francisco Freire Allemão e Cysneiro (1797–1874), Brazilian botanist who collected many Brazilian plants
- Perry A. Frey (born 1935), American biochemist known for work on enzyme mechanisms
- Irwin Fridovich (1929–2019), American biochemist who discovered and studied superoxide dismutase
- Elias Magnus Fries (1794–1878), Swedish mycologist and botanist, one of the founders of modern mushroom taxonomy
- Karl von Frisch (1886–1982), Austrian ethologist and Nobel laureate, best known for pioneering studies of bees
- Imre Frivaldszky (1799–1870), Hungarian botanist who wrote on plants, snakes, snails and insects
- János Frivaldszky (1822–1895), Hungarian entomologist and ornithologist
- Joseph S. Fruton (1912–2007), Polish-American biochemist who worked on proteases, best known for his book General Biochemistry
- Leonhart Fuchs (1501–1566), German physician and botanist, author of a book on medicinal plants
- José María de la Fuente Morales (1855–1932), Spanish priest and poet who studied insects and collected reptiles and amphibians
- Louis Agassiz Fuertes (1874–1927), American ornithologist, illustrator and major American bird artist
- Kazimierz Funk (1884–1967), Polish-American biochemist, discoverer of vitamin B3 (niacin).
- Robert F. Furchgott (1916–2009), American biochemist known for discovering the biological roles of nitric oxide; Nobel Prize 1998

== G ==
=== Ga–Gh ===
- Elmer L. Gaden (1923–2012), American biochemical engineer, the "father of biochemical engineering"
- Joseph Gaertner (1732–1791), German botanist, author of De Fructibus et Seminibus Plantarum
- François Gagnepain (1866–1952), French botanist who studied the Annonaceae
- Joseph Paul Gaimard (1796–1858), French naval surgeon and naturalist
- Biruté Galdikas (1946–2026), Lithuanian-Canadian primatologist, expert on orangutans
- Robert Gallo (born 1937), American virologist and co-discoverer of HIV
- Francis Galton (1822–1911), British polymath, proponent of social Darwinism, eugenics and scientific racism
- William Gambel (1823–1849), American naturalist, ornithologist, and botanist, the first to collect specimens in Santa Fe
- Prosper Garnot (1794–1838), French surgeon and naturalist who collected specimens in South America
- Charles Gaudichaud-Beaupré (1789–1854), French botanist on a circumglobal expedition in 1817–1820
- Georgy Gause (1910–1986), Soviet and Russian biologist and evolutionist, who proposed the competitive exclusion principle, fundamental to the science of ecology.
- Michael Gazzaniga (born 1939), American cognitive neuroscientist, best known for his research on split-brain patients
- Patrick Geddes (1854–1932), Scottish biologist, sociologist, geographer and pioneering town planner
- Howard Scott Gentry (1903–1993), American botanist, authority on agaves
- Vladimir Geptner (1901–1975), Soviet zoologist who studied the mammals of the USSR and was a pioneer of biogeographic research
- John Gerard (1545–1611/12), English botanist, author of Herball, or Generall Historie of Plantes
- Conrad von Gesner (1516–1565), Swiss physician, naturalist, bibliographer, and philologist, the father of modern scientific bibliography
- Luca Ghini (1490–1566), Italian physician and botanist, creator of the first recorded herbarium and the first botanical garden in Europe

=== Gi–Gm ===
- Clelia Giacobini (1931–2010), Italian microbiologist, a pioneer of microbiology applied to conservation-restoration
- Quentin Gibson (1918–2011), British-American biochemist known for work on haem proteins
- Walter Gilbert (born 1932). American biochemist awarded the Nobel Prize (1980) for work on DNA sequencing.
- John H. Gillespie (first publication 1973), American molecular evolutionist and population geneticist
- Ernest Thomas Gilliard (1912–1965), American ornithologist on expeditions to South America and New Guinea.
- Charles Henry Gimingham (1923–2018), British botanist who studied heathlands and heathers.
- Charles Frédéric Girard (1822–1895), French biologist, ichthyologist, herpetologist
- Johann Friedrich Gmelin (1748–1804), German naturalist who named many species of gastropods
- Johann Georg Gmelin (1709–1755), German naturalist who travelled Siberia
- Samuel Gottlieb Gmelin (1744–1774), German botanist who explored the rivers Don and Volga

=== Go–Gra ===
- Frederick DuCane Godman (1834–1919), English naturalist and ornithologist
- Émil Goeldi (1859–1917), Swiss-Brazilian naturalist and zoologist
- Johann Wolfgang von Goethe (1749–1832), German poet, novelist and biologist who developed a theory of plant metamorphosis
- Richard Benedict Goldschmidt (1878–1958), German geneticist who attempted to integrate genetics, development, and evolution
- Joseph L. Goldstein (born 1940), American biochemist awarded the Nobel Prize for studies of cholesterol
- Eugene Goldwasser (1922–2010), American biochemist who identified erythropoietin
- Camillo Golgi (1843–1926), Italian physician and Nobel prize winner, pioneer in neurobiology
- Nina Golubkova (1932–2009), Soviet lichenologist
- Jane Goodall (1934–2025), British primatologist, ethologist and anthropologist who studied chimpanzee society
- George Gordon (1806–1879), British botanist, expert on conifers
- Philip Henry Gosse (1810–1888), English naturalist, originator of the Omphalos hypothesis, or "Last Thursdayism"
- Michael M. Gottesman (born 1946), American biochemist who discovered of P-glycoprotein.
- Augustus Addison Gould (1805–1866), American physician, conchologist and malacologist
- John Gould (1804–1881), English ornithologist whose work on finches contributed to the theory of natural selection
- Stephen Jay Gould (1941–2002), American paleontologist and popular science writer
- Alfred Grandidier (1836–1921), French naturalist and explorer, author of L'Histoire physique, naturelle et politique de Madagascar
- Guillaume Grandidier (1873–1957), French geographer, ethnologist, zoologist who studied Madagascar
- Temple Grandin (born 1947), American animal scientist, a designer of humane livestock facilities and writer on her experience with autism
- Sam Granick (1909–1977), American biochemist known for studies of iron metabolism.
- Chapman Grant (1887–1983), American herpetologist, historian, and publisher
- Ulysses Simpson Grant IV (1893–1977), American geologist and paleontologist known for his work on fossil mollusks
- Pierre-Paul Grassé (1895–1985), French zoologist, expert on termites and proponent of neo-Lamarckian evolution
- Asa Gray (1810–1888), American botanist who argued that religion and science are not necessarily mutually exclusive
- George Robert Gray (1808–1872), English zoologist, author of Genera of Birds
- John Edward Gray (1800–1875), English zoologist who described many species new to science
- Julie E. Gray (20th–21st century), British plant molecular biologist
- Andrew Jackson Grayson (1819–1869), American ornithologist and artist, author of Birds of the Pacific Slope

=== Gre–Gu ===
- David E. Green (1910–1983), American biochemist, pioneer in the study of enzymes involved in oxidative phosphorylation
- Amy Greer (20th century) Trent University, Associate Professor in January 2024
- William King Gregory (1876–1970), American zoologist, expert on mammalian dentition, contributor to evolutionary theory
- Janet Grieve (1940–2025), New Zealand biological oceanographer known for work on marine taxonomy and biological productivity
- Frederick Griffith (1879–1941), British bacteriologist who studied the epidemiology and pathology of bacterial pneumonia
- Jan Frederik Gronovius (1690–1762), Dutch botanist, patron of Linnaeus, author of Flora Virginica
- Pavel Grošelj (1883–1940), Slovene biologist who studied the nervous system of jellyfish
- Colin Groves (1942–2017), British-Australian biologist and anthropologist, author of Primate Taxonomy
- Félix Édouard Guérin-Méneville (1799–1874), French entomologist commemorated in the scientific names of dozens of genera and species
- Johann Anton Güldenstädt (1745–1781), German naturalist and explorer who worked on the biology, geology, geography, and linguistics of the Caucasus
- Allvar Gullstrand (1862–1930), Swedish ophthalmologist, awarded the Nobel Prize for work on the lens of the eye
- Johann Ernst Gunnerus (1718–1773), Norwegian bishop and botanist, author of Flora Norvegica
- Irwin Gunsalus (1912–2008), American biochemist who discovered lipoic acid, and coauthor of The Bacteria: A Treatise on Structure and Function
- Eupraxie Gurjanova (1902–1981), Soviet hydrobiologist, carcinologist and zoogeographer, specialist in the systematics of isopod crustaceans and amphipods
- Albert Günther (1830–1914), British zoologist, ichthyologist and herpetologist who classified many reptile species
- Alexander Gurwitsch (1874–1954), Soviet biologist and medical scientist who originated the morphogenetic field theory and discovered the biophoton
- Herbert ("Freddie") Gutfreund (1921–2021), Austrian-British biochemist known for methods for studying fast enzyme-catalysed reactions

== H ==
=== Ha ===
- James E. Haber (born 1943), American molecular biologist known for the field of DNA repair
- Ernst Haeckel (1834–1919), German physician, zoologist, and evolutionist who argued that "ontogeny recapitulates phylogeny"
- Hermann August Hagen (1817–1893), German entomologist specialised in Neuroptera and Odonata
- J. B. S. Haldane (1892–1964), British (later Indian) biologist known for work in physiology, genetics, evolutionary biology and mathematics; co-founder of population genetics
- John Scott Haldane (1860–1936), Scottish physician and physiologist who made many important discoveries about the human body and the nature of gases
- Winifred Hallwachs (born 1954), American tropical ecologist involved with Costa Rica's Área de Conservación Guanacaste
- Harlyn Odell Halvorson (1925–2008), American microbiologist who served as director of the Marine Biological Laboratory
- William Donald Hamilton (1936–2000), British evolutionary biologist who provided a rigorous genetic basis to explain altruism
- Philip Handler (1917–1981), American nutritionist and biochemist who discovered the tryptophan-nicotinic acid relationship.
- Sylvanus Charles Thorp Hanley (1819–1899), British conchologist and malacologist
- Arthur Harden (1865–1940), British biochemist who studied the fermentation of sugar and fermentative enzymes
- Thomas Hardwicke (1755–1835), English soldier and naturalist who collected numerous specimens
- Alister Clavering Hardy (1896–1985), English marine biologist and pioneer student of the biological basis of religion
- Richard Harlan (1796–1843), American naturalist, zoologist, physicist and paleontologist, author of Fauna Americana and American Herpetology
- Denham Harman (1916–2014), American biogerontologist, father of the free radical theory of aging
- Edwin B. Hart (1874–1953), American biochemist who studied farm animal diet.
- Claudia Bernadine Elisabeth Hartert (1863-1958), British/German ornithologist and illustrator
- Ernst Hartert (1859–1933), German ornithologist who studied hummingbirds
- Gustav Hartlaub (1814–1900), German physician and zoologist who studied exotic birds
- Hamilton Hartridge (1886–1976), British eye physiologist who invented the continuous-flow method for fast reactions
- Karl Theodor Hartweg (1812–1871), German botanist who collected plants from the Pacific region from Ecuador to California
- Leland H. Hartwell (born 1939), American geneticist known for discoveries of proteins that control cell division
- William Harvey (1578–1657), British physician who demonstrated the circulation of blood
- William Henry Harvey (1811–1866), Irish botanist and phycologist who specialised in algae
- Hans Hass (1919–2013), Austrian biologist and underwater diving pioneer who studied coral reefs, stingrays and sharks
- Frederik Hasselquist (1722–1752), Swedish naturalist who collected specimens for Linnaeus in the Eastern Mediterranean
- Arthur Hay (1824–1878), Scottish soldier and ornithologist who collected birds, insects, reptiles and mammals

=== He ===
- James Hector (1834–1907), Scottish geologist, naturalist, and surgeon
- Charles Hedley (1862–1926), British-Australian naturalist, expert on molluscs
- Reinhart Heinrich (1946–2006), German biophysicist who introduced and developed metabolic control analysis
- Magdalena Heinroth (1883-1932), German ornithologist, aviculturist and taxidermist
- Oskar Heinroth (1871–1945), German biologist who studied behaviour of ducks and geese, a founder of ethology
- Edmund Heller (1875–1939), American zoologist and explorer who worked on mammals
- Wilhelm Hemprich (1796–1825), German naturalist who studied the marine life of the Red Sea
- Willi Hennig (1913–1976), German biologist who studied dipterans and created the theory of cladistics
- Victor Henri (1872–1940), Russian-French physical chemist who applied ideas of physical chemistry to enzyme properties
- John Stevens Henslow (1796–1861), English mineralogist, botanist and clergyman
- Jean-Frédéric Hermann (1768–1793), French physician and naturalist mainly interested in entomology
- Johann Hermann (1738–1800), French physician and naturalist who collected many mammals, birds, reptiles and fish
- Albert William Herre (1868–1962), American ichthyologist and lichenologist known for taxonomic work in the Philippines
- Alfred Hershey (1908–1997), American bacteriologist, Nobel Prizewinner for his work on virus genetics
- Avram Hershko (born 1937), Hungarian-Israeli biochemist awarded the Nobel Prize for discovering ubiquitin-mediated protein degradation
- Philip Hershkovitz (1909–1997), American mammalogist noted especially as a primatologist
- Leo George Hertlein (1898–1972), American paleontologist who studied mollusks, echinoderms, and brachiopods

=== Hi–Ho ===
- Archibald Vivian Hill (1886–1977), British physiologist, winner of the 1922 Nobel Prize in Physiology or Medicine for elucidation of mechanical work in muscles
- Robin Hill (1899–1991), British plant biochemist known for the Hill reaction of photosynthesis
- Dorothy Hodgkin (1910–1994) British X-ray crystallographer, Nobel Prize in 1964 for work in protein crystallography.
- Brian Houghton Hodgson (1800–1894), English naturalist who described many Himalayan birds and mammals
- Jan van der Hoeven (1802–1868), Dutch zoologist who wrote about crocodiles butterflies, lancelets, lemurs and molluscs
- Bruno Hofer (1861–1916), German fisheries scientist who studied fish parasitology and pathology
- Johann Centurius Hoffmannsegg (1766–1849), German botanist, entomologist and ornithologist
- Lancelot Hogben (1895–1975), British experimental zoologist and medical statistician
- Jacques Bernard Hombron (1798–1852), French naturalist and explorer who described Antarctic plants and animals
- Leroy Hood (born 1938), American biochemist who developed high speed automated DNA sequencer
- Robert Hooke (1635–1703), British natural philosopher and secretary to the Royal Society
- Joseph Dalton Hooker (1817–1911), British botanist, explorer and director of Kew Botanic Gardens
- William Jackson Hooker (1785–1865), British botanist, director of Kew Botanic Gardens
- Frederick Gowland Hopkins (1861–1947), British biochemist awarded the Nobel Prize in 1929 for work on vitamins
- Bernard Horecker (1914–2010]. American biochemist at Cornell University known for elucidation of the pentose phosphate pathway.
- John "Jack" Horner (born 1946), American paleontologist, specialized in dinosaurs
- Norman Horowitz (1915–2005), American geneticist who devised experiments to test whether life might exist on Mars
- Thomas Horsfield (1773–1859), American naturalist who described Indonesian plants and animals
- Bernardo Houssay (1887–1971), Argentinian physiologist awarded the Nobel Prize in 1947 for work on sugar metabolism
- Martinus Houttuyn (1720–1798), Dutch naturalist who studied Pteridophytes, Bryophytes and Spermatophytes
- Albert Howard (1873–1947), British botanist, expert on compost
- Henry Eliot Howard (1873–1940), English ornithologist, who studied territorial behaviour in birds

=== Hr–Hy ===
- Sarah Blaffer Hrdy (born 1946), American anthropologist who works on evolutionary psychology and sociobiology
- David H. Hubel (1926–2013), Canadian-American neurobiologist, awarded the Nobel Prize in 1981 for studies of the structure and function of the visual cortex.
- François Huber (1750–1831), Swiss entomologist who specialized in honey bees
- Ambrosius Hubrecht (1853–1915), Dutch zoologist whose major work was in embryology and placentation of mammals
- William Henry Hudson (1841–1922), Argentinian-British ornithologist, advocate of Lamarckian evolution, critic of Darwinism and vitalist
- Alexander von Humboldt (1769–1859), German naturalist and explorer whose work on botanical geography laid the foundation for the field of biogeography
- Allan Octavian Hume (1829–1912), British ornithologist who made a large collection of Indian birds
- George Evelyn Hutchinson (1903–1991), British-American ecologist and limnologist who applied mathematics to ecology
- Frederick Hutton (1835–1905), English biologist and geologist who used natural selection to explain the natural history of New Zealand
- Hugh Huxley (1924–2013), British molecular biologist who worked on muscle physiology
- Julian Sorell Huxley (1887–1975), English zoologist and contributor to the modern evolutionary synthesis; first Director-General of UNESCO
- Thomas Henry Huxley (1825–1895), English zoologist who clarified relationships between invertebrates
- Alpheus Hyatt (1838–1902), American zoologist and palaeontologist, proponent of neo-Lamarckism
- Libbie Hyman (1888–1969), American invertebrate zoologist, author of A Laboratory Manual for Elementary Zoology
- Josef Hyrtl (1810–1894), Austrian anatomist, author of a well-known textbook of human anatomy

== I ==
- Hermann von Ihering (1850–1930), German-Brazilian zoologist who collected specimens in Brazil to send to Germany
- Johann Karl Wilhelm Illiger (1775–1813), German zoologist and entomologist who overhauled the Linnaean system.
- Jan Ingenhousz (1730–1799), Dutch physiologist, biologist and chemist known for discovering photosynthesis
- Tom Iredale (1880–1972), English conchologist and ornithologist who published many systematic names
- Yuri Isakov (1912–1988), Soviet ornithologist and biogeographer, who specialized in water birds and pioneered wetland conservation in the Soviet Union
- Paul Erdmann Isert (1756–1789), German botanist who collected plant specimens from West Africa
- Harvey Itano (1920–2010), American biochemist who studied the molecular basis of sickle cell anaemia
- Ilya Ivanov (1870–1932), Soviet biologist who specialized in the field of artificial insemination and the interspecific hybridization of animals

== J ==
- François Jacob (1920–2013), French biologist awarded the Nobel prize for studies of the regulation of transcription
- Nikolaus Joseph von Jacquin (1727–1817), Dutch-Austrian botanist, chemist and mineralogist who collected plants in the Caribbean region
- Honoré Jacquinot (1815–1887), French surgeon and zoologist who described and illustrated mollusc species
- Daniel H. Janzen (born 1939), American entomologist and ecologist who has catalogued the biodiversity of Costa Rica
- William Jardine (1800–1874), Scottish naturalist known for his book series The Naturalist's Library
- Feliks Pawel Jarocki (1790–1865), Polish zoologist, curator of a large zoological collection
- Alec Jeffreys (born 1950), British biochemist and geneticist who invented genetic fingerprinting
- William Jencks (1927–2007), American biochemist who applied chemical mechanisms to enzyme-catalysed reactions, author of Catalysis in Chemistry and Enzymology
- Thomas C. Jerdon (1811–1872), British physician, zoologist and botanist who described bird species of India.
- John L. Jinks (1929–1987), British geneticist known for cytoplasmic inheritance
- Wilhelm Johannsen (1857–1927), Danish pharmacist, botanist, plant physiologist and geneticist who introduced the terms gene, phenotype and genotype
- Pauline Johnson (20th–21st century), English immunologist and microbiologist concerned with innate and adaptive immune mechanisms
- David Starr Jordan (1851–1931), ichthyologist and eugenicist, founding president of Stanford University
- Félix Pierre Jousseaume (1835–1921), French zoologist and malacologist who collected specimens from the Red Sea
- Mike Joy (born 1959), New Zealand freshwater ecologist and science communicator
- Olivia Judson (born 1970), British evolutionary biologist and science writer
- Thomas H. Jukes (1906–1999), British-American biologist known for work in nutrition and molecular evolution
- Adrien-Henri de Jussieu (1797–1853), French botanist, author of Cours élémentaire de botanique and Géographie botanique
- Antoine Laurent de Jussieu (1748–1836), botanist who classified flowering plants
- Bernard de Jussieu (1699–1777), French naturalist who classified the plants in the royal garden at Versailles
- Ernest Everett Just (1883–1941), American biologist, author of Basic Methods for Experiments on Eggs of Marine Animals

== K ==
=== Ka–Ke ===
- Zbigniew Kabata (1924–2014), Polish specialist in fish parasitology, author of The Parasitic Copepoda of British Fishes
- Henrik Kacser (1918–1995), British geneticist and biochemist, founder of metabolic control analysis
- Emil T. Kaiser (1938–1988), Hungarian-American protein chemist known work on enzyme modification
- Pehr Kalm (1716–1779), Swedish-Finnish botanist who studied the life cycle of the 17-year periodical cicada
- Eric R. Kandel (born 1929), Austrian-American neuroscientist awarded the Nobel Prize for work on memory
- Aino Käärik (1918–2021), Estonia-born Swedish botanist, microbiologist, mycologist
- Ferdinand Karsch (1853–1936), German arachnologist, entomologist, and anthropologist
- Gustav Karl Wilhelm Hermann Karsten (1817–1908), German botanist and traveller who named many plants
- Bernard Katz (1911–2003), German-British neuroscientist and biophysicist awarded the Nobel Prize for work on nerve biochemistry
- Rudolf Kaufmann (1909–1941), German trilobitologist known for his contributions to allopatric speciation and punctuated equilibrium
- Stuart Kauffman (born 1939), American biologist widely known for his promotion of self-organization as a factor in producing the complexity of biological systems and organisms
- Johann Jakob Kaup (1803–1873), German naturalist who believed in an innate mathematical order in nature
- Janet Kear (1933–2004), English ornithologist who studied waterfowl
- Douglas Kell (born 1953), British biochemist known for research on functional genomics
- Matthew C. Keller (thesis 2004), American behavioral and psychiatric geneticist.
- John Kendrew (1917–1997), British x-ray crystallographer awarded the Nobel Prize for determining the crystal structure of myoglobin
- Gerald A. Kerkut (1927–2004), British zoologist and physiologist whose book The Implications of Evolution has been used by creationists to support their non-science
- Anton Kerner von Marilaun (1831–1898), Austrian botanist who studied phytogeography and phytosociology
- Robert Kerr (1755–1813), Scottish surgeon who translated part of Linnaeus's Systema Naturae as The Animal Kingdom
- Warwick Estevam Kerr (1922–2018), Brazilian geneticist who studied bee genetics and introduced African bees to Brazil

=== Kh–Kn ===
- Har Gobind Khorana (1922–2011), Indian-American biochemist awarded the Nobel Prize for work on the genetic code.
- Zofia Kielan-Jaworowska (1925–2015), Polish paleontologist who led several paleontological expeditions to the Gobi desert
- Motoo Kimura (1924–1994), Japanese mathematical biologist, working in the field of theoretical population genetics
- Carolyn King (thesis 1971), New Zealand zoologist specialising in mammals, particularly small rodents and mustelids
- Norman Boyd Kinnear (1882–1957), Scottish zoologist involved in the drafting of the Protection of Birds Act of 1954
- William Kirby (1759–1850), English entomologist considered the "founder of entomology"
- Heinrich von Kittlitz (1799–1874), Prussian artist, naval officer, explorer and naturalist, collector of many specimens
- Aaron Klug (1926–2018), Lithuanian/South African/British crystallographer awarded the Nobel Prize for work on the structures of nucleic acid-protein complexes
- Nikolai Knipovich (1862–1939), Russian and Soviet ichthyologist, marine zoologist and oceanographer, notable as the founder of fisheries research in the Russian North
- Jeremy Randall Knowles (1935–2008), British biochemist known for research on enzyme mechanisms

=== Ko–Ku ===
- Wilhelm Kobelt (1840–1916), German zoologist and malacologist, curator of the Senckenberg Museum
- Fritz Köberle (1910–1983), Austrian-Brazilian physician and pathologist, student of Chagas disease
- Karl Koch (1809–1879), German botanist who made botanical explorations in the Caucasus region
- Robert Koch (1843–1910), German Nobel Prize-winning physician and bacteriologist, who introduced Koch's postulates
- Emil Theodor Kocher (1841–1917), German physician awarded the Nobel Prize for his work on the thyroid gland
- Alexander Koenig (1858–1940), German naturalist who founded the Museum Koenig in Bonn
- Albert von Kölliker (1817–1905), Swiss physiologist who studied invertebrates, and later amphibians and mammalian embryos
- Charles Konig (1774–1851), German naturalist who described fossils in the British Museum
- Arthur Kornberg (1918–2007), American biochemist awarded the Nobel Prize for the discovery of DNA polymerase
- Roger D. Kornberg (born 1947), American biochemist at Stanford awarded the Nobel Prize for studies on RNA polymerase
- Adriaan Kortlandt (1918–2009), Dutch ethologist associated with the "Rift valley theory"
- Daniel E. Koshland Jr. (1920–2007), American biochemist known for protein flexibility (induced fit)
- Douglas Koshland (born 1953), American molecular biologist who uses budding yeast to study fundamental processes in cell biology
- Marian Koshland (1921–1997), American immunologist who investiated that the differences in amino acid composition of antibodies
- Albrecht Kossel (1853–1927), German physician awarded the Nobel Prize for determining the chemical composition of nucleic acids
- Platon Kostiuk (1924–2010), Soviet and Ukrainian physiologist, neurobiologist, electrophysiologist, and biophysicist
- Aleksandr Kots (1880–1964), Soviet zoologist and founding director of the State Darwin Museum in Moscow
- Hans Adolf Krebs (1900–1981), German-British biochemist awarded the Nobel Prize for the discovery of the citric acid cycle
- Gerard Krefft (1830–1881), German-Australian zoologist and palaeontologist, authot of The Snakes of Australia
- Eduardo Krieger (born 1930), Brazilian physician and physiologist known for research on hypertension
- Kewal Krishan (born 1973), Indian biological anthropologist working in forensic anthropology
- Schack August Steenberg Krogh (1874–1949), Danish physiologist, awarded the Nobel Prize in Physiology or Medicine for studies of the mechanism of regulation of skeletal muscle capillaries
- Heinrich Kuhl (1797–1821), German zoologist who studied the fauna of Java
- Eerik Kumari (1912–1984), Soviet-Estonian biologist and pioneer of ornithology and nature conservation in Estonia

== L ==
=== La ===
- Henri Laborit (1914–1995), French surgeon and physiologist who introduced the psychiatric use of chlorpromazine
- Bernard Germain de Lacépède (1756–1825), French naturalist who studied reptiles and fish
- David Lack (1910–1973), British ornithologist who introduced Lack's Principle to explain the evolution of avian clutch sizes
- Nadezhda Ladygina-Kohts (1889–1963), Soviet zoopsychologist and comparative psychologist best known for her work comparing human and chimpanzee behavior, emotion, and cognition
- Frédéric de Lafresnaye (1783–1861), French ornithologist who described new bird species
- Keith Laidler (1916–2003), British-Canadian expert on chemical and enzyme kinetics
- Jean-Baptiste Lamarck (1744–1829), French evolutionist, coined many terms like biology and fossils
- Aylmer Bourke Lambert (1761–1842), British botanist, author of A description of the genus Pinus
- Charles Lamberton (1876–1960), French paleontologist who specialized in the recently extinct subfossil lemurs
- Hildegard Lamfrom (1922–1984), German-American molecular biologist who developed a system for studying cell-free protein synthesis
- Hugh Lamprey (1928–1996), British ecologist and bush pilot who developed methods for estimating game densities in Africa
- Charles Francis Laseron (1887–1959), American-born Australian naturalist and malacologist
- John Latham (1740–1837), English naturalist who named many Australian birds, author of A General Synopsis of Birds
- Pierre André Latreille (1762–1833), French entomologist who studied arthropod systematics and taxonomy
- Charles Louis Alphonse Laveran (1845–1922), French physician awarded the Nobel Prize for discovering malaria is caused by a protozoon
- Barbara Lawrence (1909–1997), sometimes known as Barbara Lawrence Schevill, was an American paleozoologist and mammalogist
- George Newbold Lawrence (1806–1855), American ornithologist who conducted Pacific bird surveys
- Michel Lazdunski (born 1938), French neuroscientist known for work on ion channels

=== Le ===
- William Elford Leach (1790–1836), English zoologist and marine biologist, an expert on crustaceans
- Colin Leakey (1933–2018), British tropical botanist and specialist in bean science
- Louis Leakey (1903–1972), Kenyan archaeologist and naturalist known for excavations in Olduvai Gorge
- Mary Leakey (1913–1996), British paleoanthropologist who discovered the robust Zinjanthropus skull at Olduvai Gorge
- Meave Leakey (born 1942), British paleontologist who discovered Kenyanthropus platyops
- Richard Leakey (1944–2022), Kenyan paleontologist, archaeologist and conservationist who led an expedition to the Omo River, Ethiopia
- Joseph LeConte (1823–1901), American physiologist who worked on monocular and binocular vision
- Antoni van Leeuwenhoek (1632–1723), Dutch biologist, developer of the microscope
- François Leguat (c. 1637–1735), French naturalist who described species of birds and tortoises endemic to Rodrigues
- Albert L. Lehninger (1917–1986), American biochemist who discovered that oxidative phosphorylation in eukaryotes occurs in mitochondria
- Joseph Leidy (1823–1891), American paleontologist, parasitologist and anatomist who worked on dinosaur fossils
- Johann Philipp Achilles Leisler (1771–1813), German physician and naturalist who named many bird species
- Luis Federico Leloir (1906–1987), Argentinian biochemist awarded the Nobel Prize for work on sugar nucleotides, carbohydrate metabolism, and renal hypertension
- Juan Lembeye (1816–1889), Spanish ornithologist, author of Aves de la Isla de Cuba
- Leonardo da Vinci (1452–1519), Italian (Florentine) artist, who, as an anatomist, dissected and illustrated many specimens
- Jean Baptiste Leschenault de la Tour (1773–1826), French botanist and ornithologist who collected plant and bird specimens in Australia and Java
- Pierre Adolphe Lesson (1805–1888), French botanist who participated in exploration of Polynesia
- René-Primevère Lesson (1794–1849), French naturalist who described amphibian and reptile species
- Charles Alexandre Lesueur (1778–1846), French naturalist, artist and explorer who described numerous turtle species
- François Le Vaillant (1753–1824), French ornithologist who described species of birds collected in Africa
- Phoebus Levene (1869–1940), Russian-American biochemist who discovered that DNA was composed of nucleobases and phosphate
- Richard Levins (1930–2016), American biologist, population geneticist, biomathematician, mathematical ecologist, zoologist and philosopher of science who researched diversity in human populations
- Michael Levitt (born 1947), South African-Israeli-British-American biophysicist awarded the Nobel Prize for developing multiscale models of complex chemical systems
- Edward B. Lewis (1918–2004), American geneticist awarded the Nobel Prize for discovering the Drosophila Bithorax complex
- Richard Lewontin (1929–2021), American evolutionary biologist, mathematician, geneticist, and social commentator

=== Li–Ll ===
- Choh Hao Li (1913–1987), Chinese-American biochemist who discovered and synthesized human pituitary growth hormone
- Wen-Hsiung Li (born 1942), Taiwanese molecular evolutionary biologist known fr studies of the molecular clock
- Emmanuel Liais (1826–1900), French botanist who studied the plants of remote regions of Brazil
- Martin Lichtenstein (1780–1867), German zoologist who described new species of amphibians and reptiles
- Justus von Liebig (1803–1873), German chemist who contributed to agricultural and biological chemistry, one of the founders of organic chemistry.
- John Lightfoot (1735–1788), English conchologist and botanist, author of Flora Scotica which deals with Scottish plants and fungi
- Frank Rattray Lillie (1870–1947), American zoologist, early pioneer of the study of embryology
- David R. Lindberg (born 1948), American malacologist and biologist whose work has focused on sea snails
- Aristid Lindenmayer (1925–1989), Hungarian biologist who developed a system to model the behaviour of plant cells
- Vasiliy Lindholm (1874–1935), Russian malacologist and herpetologist who published works on the molluscs of Lake Baikal, the Crimea, the Caucasus and other parts of the U.S.S.R
- John Lindley (1799–1865), English botanist whose works included botanical textbooks for his students
- Heinrich Friedrich Link (1767–1850), German botanist who studied many different subjects, including physics chemistry, geology, mineralogy, botany and zoology
- Carl Linnaeus (1707–1778), Swedish botanist, father of the binomial nomenclature system
- Fritz Lipmann (1899–1986), German-American biochemist awarded the Nobel Prize for work in intermediary metabolism
- John Dillwyn Llewelyn (1810–1882), Welsh botanist and pioneer photographer

=== Lo–Ly ===
- Jacques Loeb (1859–1924), German-American biologist who studied marine invertebrates and carried out an experiment on artificial parthenogenesis in sea urchins
- Friedrich Loeffler (1852–1915), German bacteriologist who discovered the organisms causing diphtheria and foot-and-mouth disease
- Konrad Lorenz (1903–1989), Austrian awarded the Nobel Prize for work in ethology
- John Claudius Loudon (1783–1843), English botanist, author of An Encyclopædia of Gardening
- James Lovelock (1919–2022), English chemist and father of the Gaia hypothesis
- Hedvig Lovén (1867–1943), Swedish botanists who studied plant respiration
- Percy Lowe (1870–1948), English ornithologist who worked on fossil ostriches in China
- Richard Thomas Lowe (1802–1874), English botanist, ichthyologist, malacologist and clergyman known for work on the flora and fauna of Madeira
- Peter Wilhelm Lund (1801–1880), Danish zoologist and paleontologist who described pre-historic Pleistocene megafauna
- Salvador Luria (1912–1991), Italian-American microbiologist awarded the Nobel prize winner for work on viruses
- Adolfo Lutz (1855–1940), Brazilian epidemiologist, pathologist who studied tropical medicine and medical zoology
- André Lwoff (1902–1994), French microbiologist awarded the Nobel for work on viral infection of bacteria
- Marguerite Lwoff (1905–1979), French microbiologist and virologist who worked on the taxonomy of ciliate protozoa
- Richard Lydekker (1849–1915), English naturalist influential in the science of biogeography
- Feodor Felix Konrad Lynen (1911–1979), German biochemist awarded the Nobel Prize for work on cholesterol and fatty acid metabolism
- Trofim Lysenko (1898–1976), Soviet biologist and agronomist whose denunciation of genetics was very damaging

== M ==
=== Ma–Mar ===
- Jules François Mabille (1831–1904), French malacologist who discovered and studied many mollusc species
- Paul Mabille (1835–1923), French naturalist mainly interested in Lepidoptera and botany
- William MacGillivray (1796–1852), Scottish botanist and ornithologist, author of A Manual of British Ornithology
- John Macleod (1876–1935), British biochemist awarded the Nobel Prize for the discovery of insulin
- Maria Makarevych (1906–1989), Soviet botanist and lichenologist noted for studying lichens of the Carpathian region
- Kira Makarova (born 1966), Soviet-American evolutionary biologist known for her research on the biology of CRISPR and Cas9
- Marcello Malpighi (1628–1694), Italian anatomist and biologist who described physiological features related to the excretory system
- Ramon Margalef (1919–2004), Spanish ecologist who applied information theory and mathematical models
- Emanuel Margoliash (1920–2008), Israeli-American biochemist whose work on cytochrome c sequences formed the starting point for studies of protein evolution
- Leo Margolis (1927–1997), Canadian parasitologist who showed that parasites could be used to identify fish stocks
- Lynn Margulis (1938–2011), American evolutionary theorist who proposed that organelles were "captured" bacteria
- Oleksandr Markevych (1905–1999), Soviet and Ukrainian zoologist, and a prolific helminthologist and copepodologist
- Othniel Charles Marsh (1831–1899), American paleontologist who collected Mesozoic reptiles, Cretaceous birds, and Mesozoic and Tertiary mammals
- Barry Marshall (born 1951), Australian physician and microbiologist, awarded the 2005 Nobel Prize for elucidating the relationship between stomach ulcers and bacteria
- Bruce Marshall (born 1948), New Zealand malacologist who has named many species and genera
- Fermín Martín Piera (1954–2001), Spanish specialist in the systematics of Scarabaeoidea (beetles)
- Carl Friedrich Philipp von Martius (1794–1868), German botanist and explorer who collected many specimens
- John Martyn (1699–1768), English botanist, author of Historia Plantarum Rariorum
- Thomas Martyn (1735–1825), English priest and botanist, author of Plantæ Cantabrigiensis and Flora Rustica
- John Marwick (1891–1978), New Zealand palaeontologist and geologist who studied and classified mollusc fossils
- Teresa Maryańska (1937–2019), Polish paleontologist specializing in dinosaurs

=== Mas–Mc ===
- Ruth Mason (1913–1990), New Zealand botanist specialising in the taxonomy and ecology of freshwater plants
- Francis Masson (1741–1805), Scottish botanist and explorer, author of Stapeliae Novae, about South African succulents
- Gregory Mathews (1876–1949), Australian ornithologist whose papers dealt especially with taxonomy and nomenclature
- Sara Branham Matthews (1888–1962), American microbiologist, see under Branham
- Paul Matschie (1861–1926), German zoologist who described 11 new species of reptiles
- George Frederick Matthew (1837–1923), was a Canadian botanist and geologist known for work in the then-nascent field of ichnology
- William Diller Matthew (1871–1930), Canadian-American paleontologist who worked primarily on mammal fossils
- Humberto Maturana (1928–2021), Chilean philosopher and biologist known in particular for autopoiesis
- Polly Matzinger (born 1947), American immunologist known for the idea that antigen-presenting cells respond to "danger signals"
- Carl Maximowicz (1827–1891), Russian botanist who studied flora of the Far East
- Harold Maxwell-Lefroy (1877–1925), English entomologist who investigated the use of chemicals to control insects
- Robert May (1936–2020), Australian mathematician who advanced the field of population biology by application of mathematical techniques
- Ernst Mayr (1904–2005), ornithologist, systematist, philosopher of biology; originator of modern definition of "species"
- Barbara McClintock (1902–1992), American biologist, winner of a Nobel Prize for her work on the transposon, or "jumping gene"
- James V. McConnell (1925–1990), American biological psychologist who studied learning and memory transfer in planarians
- Eileen McLaughlin (thesis 1993), New Zealand biologist who studies assisted reproduction
- Mark McMenamin (born 1958), American paleontologist who has studied the Cambrian explosion and the Ediacaran biota
- Bruce McEwen (1938–2020), American neuroendocrinologist and stress hormone expert

=== Me–Mi ===
- Edmund Meade-Waldo (1855–1934), English ornithologist who discovered chick rearing behaviour of sandgrouse
- Ilya Ilyich Mechnikov (1845–1916), Russian microbiologist awarded the Nobel Prize for work on the immune system and phagocytosis
- Johann Wilhelm Meigen (1764–1845), German entomologist known for pioneering work on Diptera.
- Gregor Mendel (1822–1884), Austrian monk who is often called the "father of genetics" for his study of the inheritance of traits in pea plants
- Édouard Ménétries (1802–1861), French entomologist, an authority on Lepidoptera and Coleoptera
- Maud Leonora Menten (1879–1960), Canadian biochemist and histologist known for work on the kinetics of enzyme action
- Archibald Menzies (1754–1852), Scottish naturalist who introduced Araucaria araucana ("monkey-puzzle tree") to England
- Clinton Hart Merriam (1855–1942), American zoologist and ornithologist, author of Mammals of the Adirondacks
- John C. Merriam (1869–1945), American paleontologist known for his taxonomy of vertebrate fossils at the La Brea Tar Pits
- Don Merton (1939–2011), New Zealand conservationist who saved the black robin from extinction, and also discovered the lek breeding system of the kākāpō
- Franz Meyen (1804–1840), Prussian physician and botanist, author of Phytotomie, the first major study of plant anatomy
- Rodolphe Meyer de Schauensee (1901–1984), Swiss-American ornithologist noted for his study of South American birds
- Otto Fritz Meyerhof (1884–1951), German-American physician and biochemist awarded the Nobel Prize for research on muscles
- Leonor Michaelis (1875–1949), German biochemist known for work on enzyme kinetics, and on quinones
- André Michaux (1746–1802), French botanist and explorer noted for his study of North American flora
- François André Michaux (1770–1855), French botanist who studied trees of North America
- Aleksandr Fyodorovich Middendorf (1815–1894), Russian zoologist who described the effects of permafrost on the spread of animals and plants
- Nicholai Miklukho-Maklai (1846–1888), Russian marine biologist and anthropologist who studied indigenous people of New Guinea
- Gerrit Smith Miller Jr. (1869–1956), American zoologist who concluded that the jaw of "Piltdown man" came from a fossil ape and the skullcap from a modern human
- Jacques Miller (born 1931), French-Australian immunologist who discovered the function of the thymus
- John Frederick Miller (1759–1796), English illustrator (primarily of botany)
- Kenneth R. Miller (born 1948), American evolutionary biologist and author of Finding Darwin's God
- Philip Miller (1691–1771), Scottish botanist, author of The Gardener's and Florists Dictionary or a Complete System of Horticulture
- Alphonse Milne-Edwards (1835–1900), French zoologist who studied fossil birds and deep-sea exploration
- Henri Milne-Edwards (1800–1885), French zoologist known for work on crustaceans
- César Milstein (1927–2002), Argentinian-British biochemist awarded the Nobel Prize for developing the use of monoclonal antibodies
- Maria Rosa Miracle Solé (1945–2017), Spanish Professor Emeritus of Ecology at the University of Valencia
- Peter D. Mitchell (1920–1992), British biochemist awarded the Nobel Prize for the theory of chemiosmosis
- George Jackson Mivart (1827–1900), English biologist, author of On the Genesis of Species

=== Mo ===
- Hugo von Mohl (1805–1872), German botanist who first observed cell division under a microscope
- Paul Möhring (1710–1792), German naturalist who pioneered the classification of bird species
- Juan Ignacio Molina (1740–1829), Chilean naturalist, an early proponent of gradual evolution
- Brian Molloy (1930–2022), New Zealand botanist, a leading authority on New Zealand orchids
- Vladyslav Monchenko (1932–2016), Ukrainian zoologist and ecologist, specializing in crustaceans
- Pérrine Moncrieff (1893–1979), New Zealand ornithologist, author of New Zealand birds and how to identify them
- Jacques Monod (1910–1976), French geneticist and biochemist, awarded the Nobel Prize for discoveries concerning genetic control of enzyme and virus synthesis
- George Montagu (1753–1815), English naturalist, author of Ornithological Dictionary
- Luc Montagnier (1932–2022), French virologist, awarded the Nobel Prize for the discovery of HIV
- Rita Levi-Montalcini (1909–2012), Italian-American neurologist awarded Nobel Prize for her co-discovery of growth factors
- Tommaso di Maria Allery Monterosato (1841–1927), Italian malacologist who studied the fossil deposits of Mount Pellegrino
- Pierre Dénys de Montfort (1766–1821), French naturalist who investigated the existence of gigantic octopuses
- George Thomas Moore (1871–1956), American botanist who worked on plant pathology
- Marianne V. Moore (20th-21st century), American aquatic ecologist concerned with the threat posed to lakes from man-made origins
- Alfred Moquin-Tandon (1804–1863), French naturalist, author of L'Histoire Naturelle des Iles Canaries
- Otto Andreas Lowson Mörch (1828–1878), Swedish malacologist who described various taxa of molluscs
- Thomas Hunt Morgan (1868–1945), American geneticist who worked on mutations in the fruit fly Drosophila
- Mary Morgan-Richards (thesis 1985), New Zealand evolutionary biologist whose research focusses on topics such as speciation and hybridisation
- Harold J. Morowitz (1927–2016), American biophysicist who studied the application of thermodynamics to living systems, including the origin of life
- Desmond Morris (1928–2026), British zoologist and biologist, author of The Naked Ape
- Roger Morse (1927–2000), American entomologist, expert on bees and beekeeping
- Guy Mountfort (1905–2003), English ornithologist and conservationist, author of A Field Guide to the Birds of Britain and Europe
- Alizade Valida Movsum (1946- ) member of Azerbaijan National Academy of Sciences
- Jennifer Moyle (1921-2016), British biochemist involved in the development of the chemiosmosic theory

=== Mu ===
- Ladislav Mucina (born 1956), Slovak botanist who works on plant ecology and biogeography
- Ferdinand von Mueller (1825–1896), German-Australian physician, geographer, and botanist who collected and studied many Australian plants
- John Muir (1838–1914), Scottish-American naturalist and conservationist who co-founded the Sierra Club
- Otto Friedrich Müller (1730–1784), Danish naturalist who studied worms and other invertebrates
- Fritz Müller (1821–1897), German-Brazilian naturalist who studied the natural history of the Atlantic forest south of São Paulo
- Hermann Müller (Thurgau) (1850–1927), Swiss botanist and oenologist who published on topics in viticulture and winemaking
- Hermann Joseph Muller (1890–1967), American geneticist awarded the 1946 Nobel Prize in Physiology or Medicine
- Philipp Ludwig Statius Müller (1725–1776), German zoologist who classified the dugong, guanaco, potto and other species
- Salomon Müller (1804–1864), Dutch naturalist and explorer who collected specimens in the Dutch East Indies
- Kary Mullis (1944–2019), American biochemist, awarded Nobel Prize after inventing the polymerase chain reaction
- Otto von Münchhausen (1716–1774), German botanist who studied oaks in particular
- John Murray (1841–1914), Scottish-Canadian marine biologist and oceanographer who collected marine species

== N ==
=== Na–Ne ===
- Gary Paul Nabhan (born 1952), Lebanese-American conservationist, co-author of Forgotten Pollinators
- David Nachmansohn (1899–1983), German biochemist who elucidated the role of phosphocreatine in muscular energy production
- Carl Nägeli (1817–1891), Swiss botanist who studied cell division and pollination
- Nikolai Nasonov (1855–1939), Russian and Soviet zoologist who has studied the evolution of ants
- Johann Friedrich Naumann (1780–1857), German founder of scientific ornithology, author of The Natural History of German Birds
- Sergei Navashin (1857–1930), Soviet botanist and cytologist who discovered double fertilization in flowering plants, a fundamental process in angiosperm reproduction
- John Needham (1713–1781), English priest and naturalist who claimed to have observed spontaneous generation
- Joseph Needham (1900–1995), British biochemist, historian (of Chinese science) who studied embryology and morphogenesis
- Oleg Negrobov (1941–2021), Russian entomologist who described more than 350 taxa of Dolichopodidae
- Christian Gottfried Daniel Nees von Esenbeck (1776–1858), German botanist and zoologist who described many plant species
- Masatoshi Nei (1931–2023), Japanese-American evolutionary biologist and molecular population geneticist
- Wendy Nelson (thesis 1980), New Zealand marine phycologist who studies seaweeds
- Randolph M. Nesse (born 1948), American evolutionary biologist and psychiatrist who has studied aging
- Charles F. Newcombe (1851–1924), British botanist who studied the botany of North America
- Frank Newhook (1918–1999), New Zealand plant pathologist who studied fungal pathogens
- Alfred Newton (1829–1907), English ornithologist, author of a four-volume Dictionary of Birds

=== Ni–Nu ===
- Margaret Morse Nice (1883–1974), American ornithologist, author of Studies in the Life History of the Song Sparrow
- Henry Alleyne Nicholson (1844–1899), British zoologist who studied fossil invertebrates
- Hermann Niemeyer (1918–1991), Chilean biochemist and paediatrician known for work on mammalian metabolism
- Alexander Nikolsky (1858–1942), Russian and Ukrainian zoologist who was the taxonomic authority of 26 reptile species
- Marshall Warren Nirenberg (1927–2010), American biochemist and geneticist who took the first step in deciphering the genetic code
- Elmer Noble (1909–2001), American parasitologist who described a pathogenic myxosporean
- Alfred Merle Norman (1831–1918), English clergyman and naturalist who studied invertebrates
- Alfred John North (1855–1917), Australian ornithologist who described many birds for the first time
- Alex B. Novikoff (1913–1987), Russian-american biologist who is recognized for his pioneering works in the discoveries on cell organelles
- Paul Nurse (born 1949), British geneticist awarded the Nobel Prize for work control of the cell cycle
- Christiane Nüsslein-Volhard (born 1942), German biologist awarded the Nobel Prize for studies of genes involved in the development of fruit fly embryos
- Thomas Nuttall (1786–1858), English botanist and zoologist, author of the Manual of the Ornithology of the United States and of Canada

== O ==
=== Oc–Ok ===
- Severo Ochoa (1905–1993), Spanish and American biochemist, Nobel Prize awarded the Nobel Prize for work on elucidating the genetic code
- Eugene P. Odum (1913–2002), American ecologist, coauthor of Fundamentals of Ecology
- Howard T. Odum (1924–2002), American ecologist who pioneered the field of systems ecology
- William Ogilby (1808–1873), British zoologist concerned with classification and naming of animal species
- William Robert Ogilvie-Grant (1863–1924), Scottish ornithologist who made many collecting trips, including Socotra and Madeira and the Canaries
- Sergey Ognev (1886–1951), Russian zoologist who studied Russian mammals
- Alexander George Ogston (1911–1996), British biochemist who explained how an achiral substance can have a chiral product in the tricarboxylate cycle
- Tomoko Ohta (born 1933), Japanese molecular biologist who developed the nearly neutral theory of evolution
- Reiji Okazaki (1930–1975), Japanese molecular biologist who discovered Okazaki fragments, important in DNA replication
- Tsuneko Okazaki (born 1933), Japanese molecular biologist who discovered Okazaki fragments, important in DNA replication
- Lorenz Oken (1779–1851), German naturalist who developed a classification of animals

=== Ol–Ow ===
- Giuseppe Olivi (1769–1795), Italian naturalist who studied the fauna of the seabed
- Mark A. O'Neill (born 1959), British biologist and computer scientist who has worked on artificial life and biologically inspired computing
- Aleksandr Oparin (1894–1980), Russian biologist and biochemist, best known for his work on the origin of life
- Alcide d'Orbigny (1802–1857), French naturalist who collected many specimens in South America
- George Ord (1781–1866), American ornithologist, author of American Ornithology
- Yuri Orlov (zoologist) (1893–1966), Soviet zoologist and paleontologist. Academician of the Academy of Sciences of the Soviet Union
- Eleanor Anne Ormerod (1828–1901), English entomologist who developed agricultural entomology
- Edward Latham Ormerod (1819–1873), English physician and entomologist, author of British Social Wasps
- Joan Oró (1923–2004), Spanish biochemist known for studies of the origin of life
- H. Allen Orr (born 1960) American evolutionary geneticist working on the genetics of speciation and of adaptation
- Anders Sandøe Ørsted (1816–1872), Danish botanist who travelled in Central America and the Caribbean and published papers on the flora
- Henry Fairfield Osborn (1857–1935), American eugenicist who led many fossil-hunting expeditions to the American Southwest
- William Charles Osman Hill (1901–1975), British anatomist, primatologist and expert on primate anatomy
- Halszka Osmólska (1930–2008), Polish paleontologist specializing in dinosaurs
- Janina Oszast (1908–1986), Polish biologist and palaeobotanist and resistance movement member
- Emile Oustalet (1844–1905), French zoologist who studied birds in particular
- Ray D. Owen (1915–2014), American immunologist whose work led to modern immunology and organ transplantation
- Richard Owen (1804–1892), British biologist, paleontologist, and taxonomist of fossil and extant organisms

== P ==
=== Pa–Pe ===
- George Emil Palade (1912–2008), Romanian-American biologist who discovered ribosomes, awarded the Nobel Prize for innovations in electron microscopy and cell fractionation
- Paul Maurice Pallary (1869–1942), French-Algerian malacologist who named many mollusc species
- Peter Simon Pallas (1741–1811), Prussian zoologist who described numerous animal species
- Edward Palmer (1829–1911), British botanist who collected American plants for the Smithsonian Institution
- Josif Pančić (1814–1888), Serbian botanist who documented the flora of Serbia
- Paracelsus (Theophrastus von Hohenheim) (1493–1541), Swiss physician and alchemist who pioneered toxicology
- Carl Parrot (1867–1911), German gynaecologist and ornithologist interested in the distribution and migration of birds
- Louis Pasteur (1822–1895), French biologist, microbiologist, and chemist who established principles of vaccination
- William Paterson (1755–1810), British soldier, botanist and explorer who collected botanical, geological and insect specimens in Australia
- David J. Patterson (born 1950) British biologist, studied protist taxonomy and evolution, later biodiversity informatics, Zoological Society of London, Silver medal
- Daniel Pauly (born 1946), French marine biologist who has developed techniques to estimate the growth and mortality of fishes
- Ivan Pavlov (1849–1936), Russian physiologist, psychologist and physician who discovered conditioning, and awarded the Nobel Prize for work on the digestive system
- Yevgeny Pavlovsky (1884–1965), Soviet zoologist and entomologist who introduced the concept of natural nidality of human diseases
- Titian Peale (1799–1885), American ornithologist, entomologist, photographer, and explorer
- Louise Pearce (1885–1959), American pathologist who helped develop a treatment for African sleeping sickness
- Donald C. Peattie (1898–1964), American botanist, author of A Natural History of Western Trees
- Eva J. Pell (born 1948), American plant pathologist who studies the physiological and biochemical impact of air pollutants
- Paul Pelseneer (1863–1945), Belgian zoologist, primarily a malacologist, but interested in all aspects of zoology
- Jean-Marie Pelt (1933–2015), French botanist who studied medicinal plants, of Afghanistan, Chile, Europe, and Yemen
- Thomas Pennant (1726–1798), Welsh naturalist and antiquary, author of History of Quadrupeds
- David Penny (1939–2024), New Zealand biologist known for theoretical biology, molecular evolution, human evolution, and the history of science
- Henri Perrier de la Bâthie (1873–1958), French botanist who studied the plants of Madagascar.
- George Perry (1771–1823), English naturalist, author of Conchology, or the natural history of shells
- Samuel Victor Perry (1918–2009) British biochemist, pioneer in muscle biochemistry
- Christian Hendrik Persoon (1761–1836), German mycologist who wrote extensively on fungi
- Wilhelm Peters (1815–1883), German naturalist who described the mammals, birds, reptiles, amphibians, river fish, insects and botany of Mozambique

=== Pf–Pl ===
- Ludwig Karl Georg Pfeiffer (1805–1877), German physician, botanist and conchologist who named more than 20 new genera and species
- Federico Philippi (1838–1910), German zoologist and botanist active in Chile
- Rodolfo Amando Philippi (1808–1904), German-Chilean zoologist who described three new species of South American lizards
- Rodulfo Amando Philippi Bañados (1905–1969), Chilean ornithologist
- David Andrew Phoenix (born 1966), British biochemist who studies properties of biologically active amphiphilic peptides.
- Frederick Octavius Pickard-Cambridge (1860–1905), English entomologist, expert on spiders
- Octavius Pickard-Cambridge (1828–1917), English entomologist, mainly interested in spiders, but also on birds, butterflies and moths
- Charles Pickering (1805–1878), American naturalist, author of Races of Man and Their Geographical Distribution
- Grace Evelyn Pickford (1902–1986), American biologist and endocrinologist, known for work on the hematology and endocrinology of fishes
- Henry Augustus Pilsbry (1862–1957), American zoologist, malacologist, leader in invertebrate taxonomy
- Gregory Goodwin Pincus (1903–1967), American biologist and co-inventor of the combined oral contraceptive pill
- Ronald Plasterk (born 1957), Dutch politician and molecular biologist who has worked on zebrafish development
- Pliny the Elder (23–79), Roman natural philosopher, author of Naturalis Historia an encyclopedia, a model of later ones

=== Po–Pu ===
- Reginald Innes Pocock (1863–1947), British taxonomist, expert on spiders and millipedes
- Felipe Poey (1799–1891), Cuban zoologist who worked on butterflies and fish
- Giuseppe Saverio Poli (1746–1825), Italian physicist and zoologist, whose collection included, especially, Lepidoptera, Cnidaria and Mollusca
- Winston Ponder (born 1941), New Zealand malacologist who has described many marine and freshwater animals, especially micromolluscs
- Leonid Portenko (1799–1891), Soviet-Ukrainian ornithologist who carried out extensive zoogeographic studies on the birds of the northern and north-eastern Palearctic realm
- Arthur William Baden Powell (1901–1987), New Zealand malacologist and paleontologist who studied and classified New Zealand molluscs
- Thomas Littleton Powys (1833–1896), English ornithologist, author of Notes on the Birds of Northamptonshire and Neighbourhood
- Karel Presl (1794–1852), Bohemian botanist, authority on Czech flora
- Alice Pruvot-Fol (1873–1972), French malacologist who described many new species, mostly on the basis of preserved animals
- Nikolai Przhevalsky (1839–1888), Russian explorer who described some previously unknown animal species, including Przewalski's horse
- Jan Evangelista Purkyně (1787–1869), Czech anatomist and physiologist who discovered the Purkinje effect and introduced the term protoplasm
- Frederick Traugott Pursh (1774–1820), German-American botanist who studied the plants collected on the Lewis and Clark Expedition
- Frank W. Putnam (1917–2006), American biochemist who worked on the structure and function of blood proteins
- Paul Émile de Puydt (1810–1888), Belgian botanist, interested in particular in orchids

== Q ==
- Juda Hirsch Quastel(1899–1987), British-Canadian biochemist known for research in neurochemistry, metabolism and cancer
- Jean Louis Armand de Quatrefages de Bréau (1810–1892), French naturalist whose work ranged from the annelids to man.
- Jean René Constant Quoy (1790–1869), French zoologist who studied the origins of coral reefs

== R ==
=== Ra ===
- George Radda (1936–2024), Hungarian chemist, known for molecular imaging of heart metabolism
- Gustav Radde (1831–1903), German naturalist and explorer whose work encompassed birds, amphibians, reptiles, lizards, snakes and insects
- Thomas Stamford Raffles (1781–1826), British biologist who studied mammals, fish, birds and insects
- Constantine Samuel Rafinesque (1783–1840), French zoologist and botanist who described many North American species
- Émile Louis Ragonot (1843–1895), French entomologist who named many genera of butterflies and moths
- Rama Das V.S. (1933–2010), Indian botanist who studied photosynthesis.
- Santiago Ramón y Cajal (1852–1934), Spanish histologist awarded the Nobel prize for work on neuroanatomy and the central nervous system
- Edward Pierson Ramsay (1842–1916), Australian ornithologist, author of Catalogue of the Australian Birds in the Australian Museum at Sydney
- Austin L. Rand (1905–1982), Canadian zoologist who studied birds of Madagascar and New Guinea
- Suresh Rattan (born 1955), Indian biogerontologist who has formulated the concepts of essential lifespan and virtual gerontogenes
- John Ray (1627–1705), English naturalist whose classification of plants Historia Plantarum was a step towards modern taxonomy

=== Re ===
- Francesco Redi (1626–1697), Italian physician known for his experiment in 1668 which is regarded as one of the first steps in refuting spontaneous generation
- Lovell Augustus Reeve (1814–1865), English conchologist, author of many publications on mollusc shells
- Heinrich Gustav Reichenbach (1823–1889), German orchidologist, the world's leading authority on orchids
- Ludwig Reichenbach (1793–1879), German botanist and ornithologist who introduced the idea of displaying invertebrate creatures as glass models
- Anton Reichenow (1847–1941), German ornithologist known for classifying birds in six groups
- Johann Eduard Reichenow (1883–1960), German protozoologist, son of ornithologist Anton Reichenow
- Caspar Georg Carl Reinwardt (1773–1854), Dutch botanist who studied amphibians and reptiles as well as plants
- Bernhard Rensch (1900–1990), German evolutionary biologist who searched for universal rules, such as Allen's Rule, Gloger's Rule and Rensch's rule
- Ralf Reski (born 1958), German botanist and biotechnologist who developed Physcomitrella as model organism

=== Ri ===
- Jacques Ricard (1929–2018), French biophysicist known for studies of plant enzymes and enzyme memory
- Achille Richard (1794–1852), French botanist who studied and described several genera of orchids
- Jean Michel Claude Richard (1787–1868), French botanist and plant collector
- Louis Claude Richard (1754–1821), French botanist who collected botanical specimens in the Caribbean region
- Olivier Jules Richard (1836–1896), French lichenologist who worked on the anatomy and symbiosis of lichens.
- John Richardson (1787–1865), Scottish naturalist who explored the Arctic region
- Charles Richet (1850–1935), French physiologist awarded the Nobel Prize for his discovery of anaphylaxis
- Charles Wallace Richmond (1868–1932), American ornithologist, compiler of the Richmond Index of Latin names of birds
- Robert Ridgway (1850–1929), American ornithologist, author of The Birds of North and Middle America
- Henry Nicholas Ridley (1855–1956), British botanist who promoted rubber as a commercial product
- Christina Riesselman (thesis 2011), American paleoceanographer whose research focus is on Southern Ocean response to changing climate

=== Ro–Ru ===
- Austin Roberts (1883–1948), South African zoologist, posthumous author of The mammals of South Africa
- Thorburn Brailsford Robertson (1884–1930), Australian physiologist, biochemist, gerontologist, and animal nutritionist
- Harold E. Robinson (1932–2020), American botanist and entomologist who worked on sunflowers and the bryophytes
- Maurício Rocha e Silva (1910–1983), Brazilian physician and pharmacologist, codiscoverer of bradykinin
- Martin Rodbell (1925–1998), American biochemist and molecular endocrinologist awarded the Nobel Prize for work on signal transduction in cells
- George Romanes (1848–1894), Scottish-Canadian evolutionary biologist and physiologist who laid the foundation of comparative psychology
- Alfred Romer (1894–1973), American paleontologist whose textbook Vertebrate Paleontology laid the foundation for classifying vertebrates
- Steven Rose (1938–2025), English neurobiologist
- Barry P. Rosen (born 1944), American biochemist at Florida International University known for research into the molecular mechanisms of arsenic and antimony metabolism
- Robert Rosen (1934–1998), American theoretical biologist who studied the defining principles of life
- Joel Rosenbaum (born 1933), American cell biologist who studies cilia and flagella in the model species Chlamydomonas
- Harald Rosenthal (born 1937), German hydrobiologist known for his work in fish farming and ecology
- Miriam Louisa Rothschild (1908–2005), British entomologist, an authority on fleas, and the first person to work out the flea's jumping mechanism
- Walter Rothschild (1868–1937), British zoologist interested in the taxonomy of birds and butterflies
- Joan Roughgarden (born 1946), American ecologist, evolutionary biologist and philosopher of science
- Michael Rout (living), molecular and cellular biologist
- William Roxburgh (1759–1815), Scottish botanist who studied sugarcane, indigo and sago
- Adriaan van Royen (1704–1779), Dutch botanist known for work on the flora of Southeast Asia
- Karl Rudolphi (1771–1832), Swedish-German physiologist regarded as the father of helminthology
- Eduard Rüppell (1794–1884), German naturalist and explorer, the first naturalist to traverse Ethiopia

== S ==
=== Sa ===
- Joseph Sabine (1770–1837), English naturalist, authority on the moulting, migration, and habit of British birds
- Julius von Sachs (1832–1897), German botanist who first demonstrated hydroponics
- Frederick Sanger (1918–2013), British biochemist twice awarded the Nobel Prize, for protein sequencing and for nucleic acid sequencing
- Étienne Geoffroy Saint-Hilaire (1772–1844), French naturalist who established the principle of unity of composition
- Isidore Geoffroy Saint-Hilaire (1805–1861), French zoologist who coined the term éthologie (ethology), authority on deviation from normal structure
- Carl Ulisses von Salis-Marschlins (1762–1818), Swiss naturalist interested in botany, entomology, and conchology
- Edward James Salisbury (1886–1978), British botanist with "notable contributions to plant ecology and to the study of the British flora generally"
- Richard Anthony Salisbury (1761–1829), British botanist, shunned by many botanists of his day
- Jonas Salk (1914–1995), American biologist developed one of the first successful polio vaccines
- Robert Sapolsky (born 1957), American neuroscientist who studies sources of stress in wild baboons
- Georg Ossian Sars (1837–1927), Norwegian marine biologist who studied the eggs and larvae of fish
- Michael Sars (1809–1869), Norwegian taxonomist who described life-histories and reproductive cycles, behaviour and geographical dispersal of fish
- Konstantin Satunin (1863–1915), Russian zoologist who described mammals of Russia and Central Asia
- William Saunders (1822–1900), American botanist responsible for introducing many fruits and vegetables to American agriculture
- Marie Jules César Savigny (1777–1851), French zoologist who wrote about the fauna in the Mediterranean Sea and the Red Sea
- Thomas Say (1787–1843), American naturalist, the father of American descriptive entomology and American conchology

=== Sc ===
- George Schaller (born 1933), American zoologist, one of the preeminent field biologists of the 20th century
- Albert Schatz (1920–2005), American microbiologist who discovered streptomycin
- Julius Schaxel (1887–1943), German developmental biologist and zoologist
- Paul Schimmel (born 1940) American biochemist who developed nucleic acid sequencing and coauthored Biophysical Chemistry
- Friedrich Schlechter (1872–1925), German taxonomist and botanist, author of several works on orchids
- Hermann Schlegel (1804–1884), German ornithologist, herpetologist and ichthyologist who believed that species are fixed
- Matthias Jakob Schleiden (1804–1881), German botanist and co-founder of the cell theory
- Ivan Schmalhausen (1884–1963), Soviet zoologist and evolutionary biologist
- Johannes Theodor Schmalhausen (1849–1894), Russian botanist
- George Schoener (1864–1941), German-American botanist who experimented on rose breeding, especially in the use of wild species
- Rudolph Schoenheimer (1898–1941), German-American biochemist, pioneer of radioactive tagging of molecules
- Johann David Schoepf (1752–1800), German botanist and zoologist who studied turtles
- Heinrich Wilhelm Schott (1794–1865), German botanist who studied plants of the arum family
- Johann Christian Daniel von Schreber (1739–1810), German naturalist who wrote a series of books that focused on the mammals of the world
- Leopold von Schrenck (1826–1894), Russian zoologist, geographer and ethnographer who studied the native peoples of Russia
- Charles Schuchert (1858–1942), American invertebrate paleontologist, a leader in the development of paleogeography
- Stefan Schuster (born 1961) German biophysicist, pioneer in metabolic control analysis and metabolic pathway analysis
- Theodor Schwann (1810–1882), German physician and physiologist whose major contribution to biology was the extension of cell theory to animals
- Neena Schwartz (1926–2018), American endocrinologist known for her work on female reproductive biology
- Georg August Schweinfurth (1836–1925), Baltic German botanist and ethnologist who explored East Central Africa
- Philip Sclater (1829–1913), English zoologist and ornithologist who identified the main zoogeographic regions of the world.
- William Lutley Sclater (1863–1944), British zoologist and museum director
- Giovanni Antonio Scopoli (1723–1788), Italian-Austrian naturalist who collected plants and insects in the Alps

=== Se–Sl ===
- Henry Seebohm (1832–1895), English ornithologist and traveller, author of A History of British Birds
- Michael Sela (1924–2022) Israeli immunologist who works on synthetic antigens, molecules that trigger the immune system
- Prideaux John Selby (1788–1867), English botanist and ornithologist, best known for his Illustrations of British Ornithology
- Oleg Semyonov-Tyan-Shansky (1906–1990), Soviet ornithologist, naturalist, biologist and a founder of the Lapland nature reserve
- Alexei Severtsov (1866–1936), Soviet evolutionary zoologist who worked on comparative anatomy and morphology
- Nikolai Alekseevich Severtzov (1827–1885), Russian explorer and naturalist, author of Vertical and Horizontal Distribution of Turkestan Wildlife
- Emily Mary Bowdler Sharpe (born 1868), English entomologist, colourist and illustrator
- Richard Bowdler Sharpe (1847–1909), English zoologist and ornithologist who described many new species of bird
- George Shaw (1751–1813), English botanist and zoologist who published English descriptions with scientific names of several Australian animals in Zoology of New Holland
- George Ernest Shelley (1840–1910), English ornithologist, author of The Birds of Africa
- Charles Scott Sherrington (1857–1922), British physiologist and neuroscientist, awarded the Nobel Prize for work on the functions of neurons
- Philipp Franz von Siebold (1796–1866), German botanist who studied Japanese flora and fauna, and introduced Western medicine to Japan
- George Gaylord Simpson (1902–1984), American paleontologist participated in the modern synthesis, and wrote Tempo and Mode in Evolution
- Rolf Singer (1906–1994), German-born mycologist, taxonomist of gilled mushrooms (agarics)
- Norair Sisakian (1788–1867), Soviet biologist of Armenian origin who worked in the Soviet space program and is also one of the founders of space biology

=== Sm–So ===
- John Kunkel Small (1869–1938), American botanist who documented the flora of Florida
- Andrew Smith (1797–1872), Scottish surgeon, explorer, ethnologist and zoologist, author of Illustrations of the Zoology of South Africa
- Edgar Albert Smith (1847–1916), British zoologist and malacologist who published many separate memoirs on the Mollusca
- Emil L. Smith (1911–2009) American protein chemist known for studies of protein evolution
- Frederick Smith (1805–1879), British entomologist who specialized on Hymenoptera
- James Edward Smith (1759–1828), English botanist, founder and first President of the Linnean Society of London
- Johannes Jacobus Smith (1867–1947), Dutch botanist who collected specimens of plants of the Dutch East Indies as well as describing and cataloguing their flora
- James Leonard Brierley Smith (1897–1968), South African ichthyologist who identified a taxidermied fish as a coelacanth
- Margaret Mary Smith (née MacDonald; 1916–1987), South African ichthyologist and fish illustrator
- John Maynard Smith (1920–2004), British theoretical and mathematical evolutionary biologist and geneticist who discussed the evolution of sex and signalling theory, as well as other fundamental problems
- Oliver Smithies (1925–2017), British-American geneticist and physical biochemist awarded the Nobel Prize for gel electrophoresis
- John Otterbein Snyder (1867–1943), American ichthyologist who documented the native fishes of San Francisco Bay
- Solomon H. Snyder (born 1938), American neuroscientist who co-discovered endorphins
- Eugene Sokolov (1920–2008), Soviet-Russian neuroscientist
- Olesya Vadimovna Sokur (1960–2025), Ukrainian biologist who studied the biochemical mechanisms of cell damage in gastrointestinal tract pathologies.
- Daniel Solander (1733–1782), Swedish botanist who described and catalogued many plants of Australia and New Zealand
- Alberto Sols (1917–1989), Spanish biochemist known for studies of metabolic regulation and for rejuvenating biochemistry in Spain
- Louis François Auguste Souleyet (1811–1852), French zoologist and malacologist who studied marine molluscs of the Pacific

=== Sp ===
- Douglas Spalding (1841–1877), English biologist who researched on animal behavior and discovered imprinting
- Lazzaro Spallanzani (1729–1799), Italian biologist whose research on biogenesis paved the way for the downfall of the theory of spontaneous generation
- Anders Sparrman (1748–1820), Swedish naturalist, author of A voyage to the Cape of Good Hope, towards...
- Walter Baldwin Spencer (1860–1929), British-Australian evolutionary biologist and anthropologist, known for fieldwork with Aboriginal peoples in Central Australia
- Roger W. Sperry (1913–1994), American neuropsychologist awarded the Nobel Prize for his split-brain research
- Maximilian Spinola (1780–1857), Italian entomologist who described many taxa
- Johann Baptist von Spix (1781–1826), German naturalist who made a comparative morphology of the skulls of primates, reptiles, birds and others
- Herman Spöring (1733–1771), Finnish explorer, draughtsman, botanist and naturalist, who collected specimens from the south Pacific
- Kurt Sprengel (1766–1833), German physician and botanist who studied the history of medicine
- Stewart Springer (1906–1991), American ichthyologist noted for shark classification, behavior and distribution of species
- Richard Spruce (1817–1893), English botanist and explorer who collected plants in South America

=== Sta–Ste ===
- Agustín Stahl (1842–1917), Puerto Rican zoologist and botanist who studied the plants of Puerto Rico
- Franklin Stahl (1929–2025), American molecular biologist and geneticist who participated in the experiment to show semiconservative DNA replication
- Edward Stanley (1775–1851), English naturalist with a large collection of living animals
- Philipp Ludwig Statius Müller (1725–1776), German zoologist who classified the dugong, guanaco, potto and other species
- G. Ledyard Stebbins (1906–2000), American botanist and geneticist, one of the leading evolutionary biologists of the 20th century.
- Japetus Steenstrup (1813–1897), Danish zoologist who discovered the possibility of using fossils to interpreting climate and vegetation changes
- Boris K. Stegmann (1898–1975), Soviet ornithologist of German descent who worked on zoogeography and introduced the idea of faunal affinities or "faunal types" to subdivide the palearctic region
- Charles M. Steinberg (1932–1999), American immunobiologist and geneticist, co-discoverer of the amber-mutants that led to the recognition of stop codons
- Franz Steindachner (1834–1919), Austrian ichthyologist and herpetologist who published work on fishes, reptiles and amphibians
- Joan Steitz (born 1941), American biochemist known for work on RNA
- Thomas A. Steitz (1940–2018), American biochemist awarded the Nobel Prize for pioneering work on the ribosome
- Leonhard Hess Stejneger (1851–1943), Norwegian-American ornithologist, herpetologist and zoologist known for work on reptiles and amphibians
- Georg Wilhelm Steller (1709–1746), German ornithologist who worked in Russia, a pioneer of Alaskan natural history
- James Francis Stephens (1792–1853), English entomologist and naturalist, author of Manual of British Beetles
- Kaspar Maria von Sternberg (1761–1838), Bohemian botanist, the "Father of Paleobotany"
- Karl Stetter (born 1941), German microbiologist, expert on microbial life at high temperatures
- Nettie Maria Stevens (1861–1912), American who discovered sex chromosomes, after observing sperm from male mealworms
- Frederick Campion Steward (1904–1993), British botanist, pioneer of plant tissue culture, genetic engineering and plant biotechnology

=== Sti–Stu ===
- Edward Charles Stirling (1848–1919), Australian anthropologist who reconstructed the skeleton of an enormous marsupial
- Gerald Stokell (1890–1972), New Zealand horticulturist and ichthyologist who described native fish
- Witmer Stone (1866–1939), American ornithologist, botanist, and mammalogist, author of The Plants of Southern New Jersey
- Gottlieb Conrad Christian Storr (1749–1821), German physician, chemist and naturalist, the taxonomic authority of the genus Mellivora
- Vida Stout (1930–2012), New Zealand limnologist whose research focused on the biology and chemistry of South Island lakes
- Eduard Strasburger (1844–1912), German botanist who proposed that new cell nuclei only arise from the division of other nuclei
- Erwin Stresemann (1889–1972), German ornithologist who compiled a comprehensive account of avian biology
- John Struthers (1823–1899), Scottish anatomist known for the ligament of Struthers, a rare character in humans
- Alfred Henry Sturtevant (1891–1970), American geneticist who constructed the first genetic map of a chromosome
- Samuel Stutchbury (1798–1859), English naturalist and geologist co-discoverer of Thecodontosaurus, the fourth dinosaur genus to be named
- Lubert Stryer (1938–2024), American biophysicist who developed the use of fluorescence spectroscopy, best known for his textbook Biochemistry

=== Su–Sz ===
- Vladimir Sukachev (1880–19677), Russian geobotanist, engineer, geographer, and corresponding member (1920) and full member (1943) of the USSR Academy of Sciences
- Richard Summerbell (born 1956), Canadian mycologist whose research explores opportunistic fungal pathogens
- Carl Jakob Sundevall (1801–1875), Swedish zoologist who developed a phylogeny for birds based on the muscles of the hip and leg
- Mriganka Sur (born 1953), Indian cognitive neuroscientist specializing in neuroplasticity
- Petr Sushkin (1868–1928), Soviet ornithologist who specialised on comparative anatomy, and evolution of birds, particularly of the birds of prey
- Henry Suter (1841–1918), Swiss-New Zealand zoologist, naturalist and palaeontologist who studied the terrestrial and freshwater molluscs of New Zealand
- Mary Sutherland (1893–1955), New Zealand botanist who pioneered work in agricultural forestry
- William Swainson (1789–1855), English ornithologist, malacologist, conchologist, entomologist and artist
- Jan Swammerdam (1637–1680), Dutch biologist and microscopist who showed that the egg, larva, pupa, and adult of an insect are different forms of the same animal
- Olof Swartz (1760–1816), Swedish botanist known for his taxonomic work and studies of pteridophytes
- Robert Swinhoe (1836–1877), English naturalist who catalogued many Southeast Asian birds
- William Henry Sykes (1790–1872), British ornithologist who catalogued birds and mammals from the Deccan
- Albert Szent-Györgyi (1893–1986), Hungarian biochemist, the first to isolate vitamin C, awarded the Nobel Prize for analysis of the tricarboxylate cycle

== T ==
=== Ta–Ti ===
- Władysław Taczanowski (1819–1890), Polish zoologist who mainly worked on ornithology but also described reptiles, arachnids and other taxa
- Armen Takhtajan (1910–2009), Armenian botanist who worked on plant evolution, systematics and biogeography
- Charles Tanford (1921–2009), American protein chemist known for analysis of the hydrophobic effect
- Leonid Petrovich Tatarinov (1926–2011), Soviet paleontologist and evolutionary biologist
- Georges Teissier (1900–1972), French mathematical biologist who contributed to the modern synthesis with quantitative methods
- Diana Temple (1925–2006), Australian pharmacologist known for work on respiratory pharmacology
- Peter Gustaf Tengmalm (1754–1803), Swedish physician and naturalist who worked on both medicine and ornithology
- Coenraad Jacob Temminck (1778–1858), Dutch zoologist whose Manuel d'ornithologie was the standard work on European birds for many years
- Theophrastus (372 BC – 287 BC), biologist and the successor of Aristotle in the Peripatetic school, popularizer of science
- Johannes Thiele (1860–1935), German zoologist and malacologist whose classification of Gastropoda remained in use for many years
- Mason Blanchard Thomas (1866–1912), American phytopathologist and botanist, coauthor of A laboratory manual of plant histology
- Michael Rogers Oldfield Thomas (1858–1929), British zoologist whose work on mammals, led to the description of many new species
- D'Arcy Wentworth Thompson (1860–1942), Scottish biologist, author of On Growth and Form
- William Thompson (1805–1852), Irish ornithologist and naturalist who published numerous notes on many aspects of birds
- Charles Wyville Thomson (1832–1882), Scottish marine biologist who studied the biological conditions of the deep seas
- Louis-Marie Aubert du Petit-Thouars (1758–1831), French botanist known for his work on orchids from Madagascar, Mauritius and Réunion
- Carl Peter Thunberg (1743–1828), Swedish naturalist who collected and described plants and animals from southern Africa and Asia
- Samuel Tickell (1811–1875), British ornithologist who contributed to the ornithology and mammalology of India
- Luuk Tinbergen (1915–1955), Dutch ornithologist and ecologist who studied examined bird migration and habitat selection
- Niko Tinbergen (1907–1988), Dutch ethologist awarded the Nobel Prize for work on organization and social behavior patterns of animals
- Ignacio Tinoco Jr. (1930–2016), American chemist known for pioneering work on RNA folding
- Arne Tiselius (1902–1971), Swedish biochemist awarded the Nobel Prize for development of protein electrophoresis.

=== To–Tu ===
- Agostino Todaro (1818–1892), Italian botanist who described Sicilian plants
- Susumu Tonegawa (1939–2026), Japanese biologist, awarded the Nobel Prize discovery of the genetic principle for generation of antibody diversity, later primarily interested in neuroscience
- John Torrey (1796–1873), American botanist who described plants of the USA
- Joseph Pitton de Tournefort (1656–1708), French botanist, the first to make a clear definition of the concept of genus for plants
- John Kirk Townsend (1809–1851), American ornithologist who collected animal specimens for John James Audubon
- Thomas Stewart Traill (1781–1862), Scottish doctor and naturalist, specialist in medical jurisprudence
- Abraham Trembley (1710–1784), Swiss naturalist, known for being the first to study freshwater polyps
- Melchior Treub (1851–1910), Dutch botanist who worked on plants of south-east Asia
- Henry Baker Tristram (1822–1906), English clergyman and ornithologist who tried to reconcile evolution and creation
- Robert Trivers (1943–2026), American evolutionary biologist and sociobiologist known for the theories of reciprocal altruism and parental investment
- Édouard Louis Trouessart (1842–1927), French naturalist who wrote Microbes, ferments and moulds
- Frederick W. True (1858–1914), American naturalist who initially studied invertebrates, and later cetaceans
- George Washington Tryon Jr. (1838–1888), American malacologist, who named more than 5,600 new molluscs species
- Chen-Lu Tsou (1923–2006), Chinese biochemist known for work on enzyme inactivation kinetics, and as the "face of Chinese biochemistry" in the west
- Bernard Tucker (1901–1950), English ornithologist, a leader of the collaborative Oxford Bird Census in 1927
- Edward Tuckerman (1817–1886), American botanist who studied lichens and other alpine plants
- Endel Tulving (1927–2023), Estonian-Canadian neuroscientist, known for his pioneering research on human memory
- Marmaduke Tunstall (1743–1790), English ornithologist, author of Ornithologica Britannica
- Ruth Turner (1915–2000), American marine biologist, expert on shipworms, wood-boring bivalve mollusks
- William Turton (1762–1835), British naturalist, author of A manual of the land and freshwater shells of the British Islands
- Albert Tyler (1906–1968), American reproductive biologist who studied development in marine organisms

== U ==
- Jakob von Uexküll (1864–1944), Estonian biologist who discussed the relationship of animals with their environment, and founded biosemiotics
- Tito Ureta (1935–2012), Chilean biochemist at the University of Chile known for work on hexokinases.
- Merton F. Utter (1917–1980), American microbiologist and biochemist known for work on intermediary metabolism

== V ==
=== Va ===
- Sebastien Vaillant (1669–1722), French botanist who studied plants in the Royal Garden
- Achille Valenciennes (1794–1865), French zoologist who studied parasitic worms in humans
- James W. Valentine (1926–2023), American evolutionary biologist
- Pablo Valenzuela (born 1941), Chilean biochemist known for genetic studies of hepatitis viruses
- Ruth van Heyningen (1917–2019), British biochemist known for her research on the lens and cataracts
- Veronica van Heyningen (born 1946), English geneticist at University College London who works on the aetiology of anophthalmia
- Donald Van Slyke (1883–1971), Dutch-American biochemist known for the measurement of gas and electrolyte levels in tissues
- Francisco Varela (1946–2001), Chilean biologist known for introducing the concept of autopoiesis
- Nikolai Vavilov (1887–1943), Soviet botanist and geneticist, who defended "bourgeois pseudoscience" (genetics) against Lysenkoism

=== Ve–Vr ===
- Craig Venter (1946–2026), American biotechnologist known for sequencing the human genome and transfecting a cell with a synthetic chromosome
- Jules Verreaux (1807–1873), French botanist and ornithologist who collected plants and animals (including human remains) in Africa and Australia
- Addison Emery Verrill (1839–1926), American zoologist who studied marine organisms
- Louis Pierre Vieillot (1748–1831), French ornithologist who studied changes in plumage, and studied live birds
- Nicholas Aylward Vigors (1785–1840), Irish zoologist who popularized the classification of birds on the basis of the quinarian system
- Rudolf Virchow (1821–1902), German biologist and pathologist, founder of cell theory, known as "the father of modern pathology"
- Oswaldo Vital Brazil (1865–1950), Brazilian physician and immunobiologist, discoverer of several antivenoms against snake, scorpion and spider bites
- Bert Vogelstein (born 1949), American geneticist, pioneer in cancer genomics
- Mary Voytek (thesis 1995), American biogeochemist and microbial ecologist who has studied environmental controls on microbial transformations of nutrients
- Hugo de Vries (1848–1935), Dutch botanist known for suggesting the concept of genes
- Pyotr Vtorov (1938–1979), Soviet biogeographer, ecologist, zoologist and nature conservation activist

== W ==
=== Wa ===
- Frans de Waal (1948–2024), Dutch ethologist, primatologist and psychologist whose research centers on primate social behavior
- Coslett Herbert Waddell (1858–1919), Irish priest and botanist known for work on difficult genera of flowering plants
- Conrad Hal Waddington (1905–1975), British developmental biologist who laid the foundations for systems biology
- Amy Wagers (thesis 1999), American biologist, stem cell and regenerative biology
- Johann Georg Wagler (1800–1832), German herpetologist and ornithologist, author of Monographia Psittacorum
- Warren H. Wagner (1920–2000), American botanist who developed an algorithm for analysing phylogenetic relationships between species
- Göran Wahlenberg (1780–1851), Swedish naturalist who worked on plant geography, author of Flora lapponica
- Selman Waksman (1888–1973), American biochemist, awarded the Nobel Prize for work on antibiotics
- Charles Athanase Walckenaer (1771–1852), French entomologist who placed the black widow in its current genus
- George Wald (1906–1997), American biologist, winner of the 1967 Nobel Prize in Physiology or Medicine for his work on visual perception
- John E. Walker (born 1941), British biochemist awarded the Nobel Prize for work on ATPases and ATP synthase
- Alfred Russel Wallace (1823–1913), British naturalist and explorer, known for independently conceiving the theory of natural selection
- Nathaniel Wallich (1786–1854), Danish botanist who described many Indian plant species
- Benjamin Dann Walsh (1808–1869), British-American entomologist who studied agricultural insect pests
- William Grey Walter (1910–1977), American-British neurophysiologist and roboticist who improved techniques of electroencephalography
- James C. Wang (born 1938), Chinese-American biochemist who discovered topoisomerases
- Deepal Warakagoda (born 1965), Sri Lankan ornithologist who identified new bird species of Sri Lanka
- Otto Heinrich Warburg (1883–1970), German biochemist awarded the Nobel Prize for pioneering studies of respiration
- Eugenius Warming (1841–1924), known as Eugen Warming, Danish botanist and pioneer of ecology.
- J. Robin Warren (1937–2024), Australian pathologist awarded the 2005 Nobel Prize for discovering that most stomach ulcers are caused by bacteria
- Arieh Warshel (born 1940). Israeli-American biochemist awarded the Nobel Prize for computational studies of functional properties of biological molecules.
- Charles Waterton (1782–1865), English naturalist who introduced curare to Europe
- James D. Watson (1928–2025), American molecular biologist, awarded the Nobel Prize-winning for discovering the structure of DNA

=== We–Wh ===
- Edwin C. Webb (1921–2006), British (later Australian) biochemist known for systematic classification of enzymes
- Philip Barker Webb (1793–1854), English botanist, author of Histoire Naturelle des Iles Canaries
- Hugh Algernon Weddell (1819–1877), English physician and botanist specializing in South American flora
- Jean Weigle (1901–1968), Swiss physicist and molecular biologist who worked on the interactions between bacteriophage λ and E. coli
- Robert Weinberg (born 1942), American cancerologist who studies oncogenes and the genetic basis of cancer
- August Weismann (1834–1914), German biologist who argued that inheritance only takes place by means of the germ cells
- Friedrich Welwitsch (1806–1872), Austrian explorer and botanist who discovered the plant Welwitschia mirabilis in Angola
- Karl Wernicke (1848–1905), German physician and neuroanatomist who discovered Wernicke's area
- Hans Westerhoff (born 1953), Dutch biochemist known for work in systems biology and metabolic regulation
- Victor Westhoff (1916–2001), Dutch botanist who published work on phytosociology and conservation
- Alexander Wetmore (1886–1978), American ornithologist, author of A Systematic Classification for the Birds of the World
- William Morton Wheeler (1865–1937), American entomologist and myrmecologist who studied the behavior and classification of ants
- William Joseph Whelan (1924–2021) British-American biochemist noted for research on glycogen and as a founder of international unions such as the IUBMB
- Gilbert White (1720–1795), English naturalist known for Natural History and Antiquities of Selborne
- John White (c. 1756–1832), English botanist who studied the native flora and fauna of Australia

=== Wi–William ===
- Robert Wiedersheim (1848–1923), German anatomist known for his list of 86 "vestigial organs" in The Structure of Man: An Index to His Past History
- Maximilian zu Wied-Neuwied (1782–1867), German explorer and ethnologist, the first in Europe to show real images of Brazilian Indians
- Hans Wiehler (1930–2003), German-American botanist who studied Gesneriaceae
- Eric F. Wieschaus (born 1947), American developmental biologist awarded the Nobel Prize for work on the genetic control of embryonic development
- Torsten Wiesel (born 1924), Swedish-American neurobiologist awarded the Nobel Prize for work on information processing in the visual system
- Joan Wiffen (1922–2009), New Zealand paleontologist who discovered numerous dinosaur fossils in New Zealand
- Siouxsie Wiles (thesis about 2005), British microbiologist who studies how glowing bacteria help to understand microbial infections
- Maurice Wilkins (1916–2004). New Zealand and British x-ray crystallographer awarded the Nobel Prize for work on the structure of DNA
- Carl Ludwig Willdenow (1765–1812), German botanist, pharmacist, and plant taxonomist, one of the founders of phytogeography
- George C. Williams (1926–2010), American evolutionary biologist known for his criticism of group selection, and for introducing the gene-centric view of evolution
- Mark Williamson (thesis 1958), British zoologist, expert on biological invasions

=== Willu–Wyn ===
- Francis Willughby (1635–1672), English ornithologist and ichthyologist who introduced innovative and effective ways of classifying animals
- Alexander Wilson (1766–1813), Scottish-American ornithologist, author of American Ornithology (nine volumes)
- Allan Charles Wilson (1934–1991), New Zealand biochemist and evolutionary biologist who pioneered molecular approaches to evolutionary changes and reconstructing phylogenies
- David Sloan Wilson (born 1949), American evolutionary biologist who supports the concept of group selection
- Edward A. Wilson (1872–1912), English naturalist and artist who painted British birds and objects seen in Antarctica
- Edward O. Wilson (1929–2021), American entomologist and father of sociobiology, expert on ants, two-time winner of the Pulitzer Prize
- Sergei Winogradsky (1856–1953), Russian microbiologist, ecologist and soil scientist who pioneered the cycle-of-life concept and studied nitrifying bacteria
- Caspar Wistar (1761–1818), American anatomist and physician who developed anatomical models to assist in teaching anatomy
- Henry Witherby (1873–1943), British ornithologist who introduced a bird-ringing scheme
- William Withering (1741–1799), English botanist who introduced the use of digitalis, the active principle in foxgloves, as a remedy
- Carl Woese (1928–2012), American microbiologist who used phylogenetic taxonomy of 16S ribosomal RNA to defined the Archaea as a new domain of life
- Friedrich Wöhler (1800–1882), German chemist known for his synthesis of urea from ammonium cyanate (a nail in the coffin of vitalism)
- Lewis Wolpert (1929–2021), South-African-British developmental biologist known for the French flag model of embryonic development
- Wong Siew Te (born 1969), Malaysian zoologist known for studies of the Malayan sun bear and efforts for its conservation
- Flossie Wong-Staal (1947–2020), American virologist known for complete genetic mapping of HIV
- Alison Woollard (born 1968) British who has studied fission yeast
- Sewall Wright (1889–1988), American geneticist, known for work on evolutionary theory and on path analysis, co-founder of population genetics
- Dorothy Wrinch (1894–1976), British mathematical biologist who promoted the cyclol structure for proteins
- V. C. Wynne-Edwards (1906–1997), Scottish zoologist known for advocacy of group selection, the theory that natural selection acts on groups

== X ==
- John Xantus de Vesey (1825–1894), Hungarian-American zoologist who collected natural history specimens for the United States National Museum

== Y ==
- Vladimir Yakhontov (1899–1970), Soviet-Uzbek entomologist, one of the leading Central Asian entomologists of the mid-20th century
- William Yarrell (1784–1856), English zoologist, author of The History of British Fishes and A History of British Birds
- Ivan Yefremov (1908–1972), Soviet paleontologist who founded taphonomy, the study of fossilization patterns
- Ada Yonath (1939–2026), Israeli crystallographer awarded the Nobel Prize for pioneering work on the structure of the ribosome
- J. Z. Young (1907–1997), British neurophysiologist who discovered the squid giant axon in the course of work on signal transmission in nerves
- Khudoyor Yusufbekov (1928–1990), Soviet botanist who made a significant contribution to the development of biological sciences and worked in the development of plant growing in the arid mountain and highland territory of Pamir-Alay

== Z ==
- Floyd Zaiger (1926–2020), American fruit geneticist who developed varieties of peaches, plums and other fruits
- Mikhail Zavadovsky (1891–1957), Soviet biologist who specialized in the reproductive biology of livestock
- Alexei Zavarzin (1886–1945), Soviet histologist and biologist who worked on evolutionary and comparative aspects of histology
- Mariya Zerova (1902–1994), Soviet-Ukrainian biologist and taxonomist known for her work in mycology
- Lev Zilber (1894–1966), Soviet micro-biologist whose work focused on virology and immunology
- Anton Zhebrak (1901–1965), Soviet botanist and geneticist
- Eberhard August Wilhelm von Zimmermann (1743–1815), German zoologist who wrote one of the first works on the geographical distribution of mammals
- Karl Alfred von Zittel (1839–1904), German palaeontologist, author of Handbuch der Palaeontologie
- Joseph Gerhard Zuccarini (1797–1848), German botanist who described plants from Japan, Mexico and other places
- Margarete Zuelzer (1877–1943), German zoologist who specialized in the study of protozoa

== See also ==
- List of biochemists
- List of biogerontologists
- List of botanists by author abbreviation
- List of carcinologists
- List of coleopterists
- List of ecologists
- List of herpetologists
- List of malacologists
- List of mammalogists
- List of microbiologists
- List of mycologists
- List of ornithologists
- List of pathologists
- List of Russian biologists
- List of zoologists by author abbreviation
- List of Nobel Prize winners in physiology or medicine
