= Gennady Ermak =

Russian scientist and writer

- Born: 1963 (age 62–63)
- Known for: Neurodegeneration, cancer, dermatology, genetics of plants
- Scientific career
- Fields: Molecular biology
- Workplaces: Swiss Federal Institute of Technology in Zurich, Switzerland; Institute of Genetics and Cytology in Minsk, Belarus; Albany Medical Center in Albany; University of Southern California

Gennady Ermak (born 1963) is a scientist and writer. He conducted research in several fields of molecular biology: neurodegeneration, cancer, dermatology, and genetics of plants. His work is cited by over 4000 other scientific publications. He is co-author of over 50 scholarly articles and several books.

He was born in the former USSR, where he acquired PhD in biology. Since then he worked at Swiss Federal Institute of Technology in Zurich, Switzerland (1991–1992), Institute of Genetics and Cytology in Minsk, Belarus (1992–1994), Albany Medical Center in Albany, NY, US (1994–1996), and The University of Southern California in Los Angeles, California (1996–2012).

After finishing his research career as professor at the University of Southern California in 2012, he became a writer. He is the author of the books Emerging Medical Technologies, Plant-based, Meat-Based and Between and Communism: The Great Misunderstanding (two editions), which was named the best book in the world history for 2016 by the National Association of Book Entrepreneurs.
