= Genrietta Dokhman =

Soviet geobiologist (1897–1987)

- Born: 9 March 1897; Kremenchug, Russian Empire (now Kremenchuk, Ukraine)
- Died: 27 October 1987 (aged 90)
- Education: Moscow State University (Candidate of Sciences, Doctor of Sciences)
- Scientific career
- Fields: Geobiology and phytocenology
- Workplaces: Krupskaia Institute of Communist Education; University of Moscow

Genrietta Isaakovna Dokhman (Russian: Генриетта Исааковна Дохман; 9 March 1897 – 27 October 1987) was a Soviet geobiologist and phytocenologist.

== Life and work ==
Genrietta Dokhman was born in 1897 in Kremenchug, in the Russian Empire (now Kremenchuk, Ukraine), into a Jewish family.

She graduated from the physical-mathematical department of the Moscow State University and did post-graduate work there while acting as an instructor in botany at the Krupskaia Institute of Communist Education from 1927 to 1930. Dokhman next worked as a geobotanist at the Institute of Agrodedology for a year and then for another year at the Department of Territorial Organization with the Territorial Organizational Research Institute of the Soviet People's Commissariat for Agriculture. She returned to Moscow State University in 1932, initially as an instructor until 1938 when she was promoted to lecturer. A year previously, she was awarded her Candidate of Sciences degree in the biological sciences. Five years later, Dokhman received her Doctor of Sciences degree. She became a full professor in 1946 and chair of the geobotany section of the Biology Department. "Dokhman wrote numerous publications on geobotanical and phytocenological subjects, including classification of steppe vegetation and history of the vegetation of the USSR."
