= Fermín Martín Piera =

Spanish naturalist (1954–2001)

- Born: 7 July 1954; Madrid
- Died: 19 July 2001 (aged 47); Madrid
- Education: Universidad Complutense de Madrid
- Known for: Scarabaeoidea, particularly dung beetles
- Scientific career
- Fields: Taxonomy, systematics, phylogeny
- Workplaces: Museo Nacional de Ciencias Naturales

Fermín Martín-Piera (7 July 1954 – 19 July 2001) was a Spanish specialist in the taxonomy, systematics, and phylogeny of Scarabaeoidea with special reference to dung beetles.

He was also keenly interested in the historical biogeography of these groups. He conducted research in community ecology with the idea of trying to ascertain the underlying causes that determined the diversity of dung beetle communities.

He was the coordinator for the Insecta portion of the Fauna Iberica project and is the author of the first volume on the Scarabaeoidea of the Iberian Peninsula.

== Works ==
- Martín Piera, F., 1981.- Corología de Onthophagus joannae Goljan, 1953 y Onthophagus ovatus (Linnaeus, 1767).
- Martín Piera, F. & Zunino, M., 1981.- Onthophagus marginalis Gebl.
- Martín Piera, F, 1982.- E. H. Rapoport, Areografia. Estrategias geográficas de las especies(recension).
- Martín Piera, F, 1982.- M. Zunino, Origine ed evoluzione degli Insetti (recension).
- Martín Piera, F, 1983.- Faune des Coléoptères de France II. Lucanoidea et Scarabaeoidea.
- Martín Piera, F, 1983.- El estatus taxonómico de Onthophagus tesquorum Semenov & Medvedev.
- Martín Piera, F., 1983.- Composición sistemática y Origen Biogeográfico de la fauna Ibérica.
- Martín Piera, F., 1983.- Los Onthophagini Ibero-Baleares.
- Martín Piera, F. & Zunino, M., 1983.- Amphionthophagus.
- Martín Piera, F., 1984.- Los Onthophagini íbero-baleares.
- Martín Piera, F., 1985.- Dos nuevos Palaeonthophagus del Asia Central.
- Martín Piera, F., 1985.- Los géneros de Melolonthini y las especies íbero-balerares de Amphimallon Berthold.
- Martín Piera, F., 1985.- Una nueva especie de Parentius Zunino, 1979 de la Región Oriental.
- Martín Piera, F. & Veiga, C. M., 1985.- Sobre dos especies mal conocidas de Scarabaeoidea.
- Martín Piera, F. & Zunino, M., 1985.- Taxonomie et biogéographie des Onthophagus du groupe de l'O..
- Veiga, C. M. & Martín Piera, F., 1988.- Claves para la identificación de la fauna española: Las familias, Tribus y Géneros de los Scarabaeoidea (Col.) íbero-baleares.
- Romero Samper, J. & Martín Piera, F., 1990.- Comportamiento reproductor de Trox perlatus hispanicus Harold.
- Lobo, J. M. & Martín Piera, F., 1993.- Las Causas de la Biodiversidad. ARBOR, 145: 91–113.
- Martín Piera, F., 1998. Escarabajos sagrados. Boletín de la Sociedad Entomológica Aragonesa.
- Martín-Piera, F. & J. I. López-Colón, 2000. Coleoptera Scarabaeoidea I. En: Fauna Ibérica. Museo Nacional de Ciencias Naturales. C.S.I.C. Madrid.
