= Ewa Bartnik =

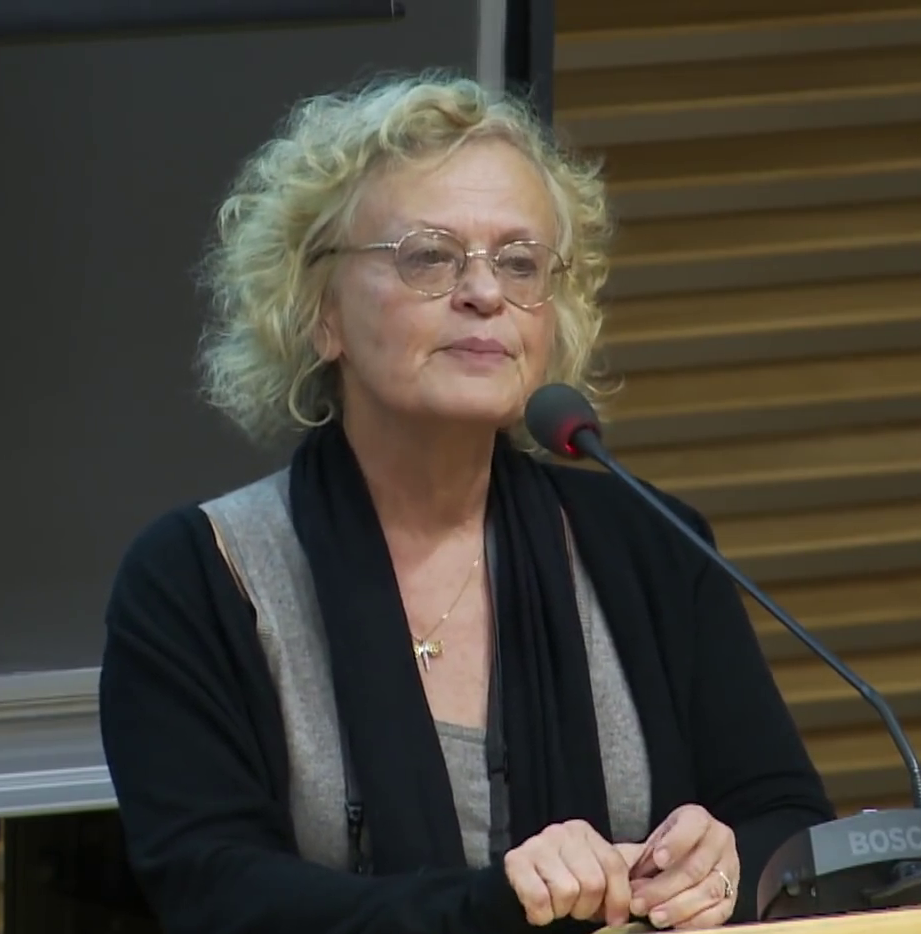
- Born: December 15, 1949; Warsaw
- Education: University of Warsaw
- Scientific career
- Fields: molecular biology, genetics
- Workplaces: University of Warsaw, Polish Academy of Sciences

Ewa Maria Bartnik, née Balicka (born December 15, 1949, in Warsaw) is a Polish biologist, Professor of Biological Sciences, university lecturer and populariser of science.

She initially studied Biology at the University of Warsaw. subsequently obtaining her PhD and habilitation. In 1993 she was appointed Professor of Biological Sciences. She began her professional career at the Department of Genetics of the University of Warsaw, later working at the Institute of Genetics and Biotechnology and at the Institute of Biochemistry and Biophysics of the Polish Academy of Sciences. Her research has dealt with issues in molecular biology and genetics, including studies of mitochondrial DNA. She served as Secretary General of the Polish Genetic Society, became Deputy Chair of the Committee of Human Genetics and Molecular Pathology of the Polish Academy of Sciences and was a member of the Central Commission for Degrees and Titles. She has co-authored biology textbooks for secondary schools and academic textbooks, and she was Poland's representative in the Life Sciences expert group of the Programme for International Student Assessment (PISA).

Ewa Maria Bartnik is also a populariser of science. In 2008 she was presented with an honorary award for media-friendly scientists by the Polish Association of Science Journalists.

In 2012 President Bronisław Komorowski awarded Ewa Maria Bartnik the Knight's Cross of the Order of Polonia Restituta for her outstanding achievements in scientific research, her teaching activities, her contribution to science in Poland and around the world, and her support of international scientific cooperation.
