= Olesya Vadimovna Sokur =

Ukrainian biologist and biochemist (1960–2025)

- Born: 25 August 1960; Uman, Ukrainian SSR, Soviet Union
- Died: 1 January 2025 (aged 64); Kyiv, Ukraine
- Cause of death: Drone strike
- Education: Taras Shevchenko National University of Kyiv
- Occupations: Biologist and biochemist
- Spouse: Igor Zima

Olesya Vadimovna Sokur (Ukrainian: Олеся Вадимівна Сокур, romanized: Olesia Vadymivna Sokur; 25 August 1960 – 1 January 2025) was a Ukrainian biologist and biochemist and Doctor of Biological Sciences. She was killed during a Russian drone attack on her Kyiv residence during the Russo-Ukrainian war.

== Biography ==
Sokur was born on 25 August 1960 in the city of Uman. In 1982, she graduated from the Faculty of Biology of Taras Shevchenko National University of Kyiv with a degree in Biologist-biochemist, Teacher of biology and chemistry.

She worked at the Institute of Clinical Radiology of the Scientific Center for Radiation Medicine of the Academy of Medical Sciences of Ukraine. She met her neurobiologist husband there and also defended her PhD thesis at the Academy on antioxidant systems in regions affected by the Chernobyl disaster.

In 2001, she was employed at Taras Shevchenko National University of Kyiv as a senior research associate and head of the research laboratory Physical and Chemical Research Methods and as a member of the Academic Council.

Beginning in 2003, Sokur held administrative positions as Deputy Dean of the Faculty of Biology and Deputy Director of the National Scientific Center "Institute of Biology and Medicine" for scientific work.

== Scientific activity ==
Sokur studied the biochemical mechanisms of cell damage in gastrointestinal tract pathologies. She authored "almost 200 publications, spoke at domestic and international scientific meetings (congresses of the biochemical, physiological and biophysical societies of Ukraine, international congresses on biochemistry and gastroenterology)."

== Death ==
On the morning of 1 January 2025, during a Russian drone attack on the capital city of Kyiv, drone fragments fell into the city center, in the Pechersk district. Some fell into the residential building on Bankova Street where Sokur lived with her husband, neurobiologist Igor Zima. She and her husband were killed, and seven other people were injured in that attack.
