= Science at the Crossroads =

Science at the Crossroads was an anthology of the contributions of the delegation from the Soviet Union which attended the Second International Congress of the History of Science. Joseph Needham provided a foreword. It was republished with a new foreword and introduction in 1971. Alfred Rupert Hall wrote a scathing review, claiming that it had little impact in the Soviet Union and that most of the contributors' careers led, rather, to the prison camp and the execution squad.

== Contents ==
The 1971 edition included:

Author	Institution	Title	Summary	Fate of author
Joseph Needham	Master of Caius College, Cambridge	New Foreword		Died at the age of 94 at his Cambridge home
P. G. Werskey	Lecturer, Science Studies Unit, University of Edinburgh	On the Reception of Science At The Cross Roads in England		Retired academic
		Foreword	Heralds Dialectical Materialism as a new culture providing a single method with ever increasing penetration into all scientific disciplines	
Nikolai Bukharin	Member of the Academy of Sciences, Director of the Industrial Research Department of the Supreme Economic Council, President of the Commission of the Academy of Sciences for the History of Knowledge.	"Theory and Practice From The Standpoint of Dialectical Materialism"		Arrested on 27 February 1937, tried at the Trial of the 21 and shot on 15 March 1938, age 49
Abram Ioffe	Member of the Academy of Sciences, Director of the Physico-Technical Institute, Leningrad, later renamed the Ioffe Institute	"Physics and Technology"		In 1950 sacked during Stalin's Anti-cosmopolitan campaign, but declared a Hero of Socialist Labor in 1955. Died 1960 shortly before his 80 birthday
Modest Rubinstein	Professor at the Institute of Economics, Moscow; Member of the Presidium of the Communist Academy, Moscow; Member of the Presidium of the State Planning Commission (Gosplan).	"Relations of Science, Technology, and Economics Under Capitalism, and in the Soviet Union"		Had a long and successful career as a Soviet academic. Member of the Soviet Pugwash Committee who participated in the Pugwash Conferences on Science and World Affairs. Died in 1969 aged 74
Boris Zavadovsky	Director of the Institute of Neuro-Humoral Physiology, Director of Timiryazev Biological Museum	The "Physical" and "Biological" in the Process of Organic Evolution"		Criticised by the supporters of Lysenko, but remained unscathed. Died in 1951, aged 56
Ernst Kolman	"Dynamic and Statistical Regularity in Physics and Biology"	President of the Association of the Scientific Institute of Natural Science, Professor of the Institute of Mathematics and Mechanics, Moscow; Member of the Presidium of the State Scientific Council.		Already had the role of ideological watchdog in scientific community, before 1931. Involved in framing Nikolai Luzin in 1936 during the Great Purge. Posted to Czechoslovakia after the Second World War, to establish communist party control over the Czechoslovak scientific community. However in 1948 he criticised Rudolf Slánský and Klement Gottwald of the Czechoslovak Communist Party. As a result he was brought back to the USSR and jailed for three years. He was released after Stalin's death, and became an active participant in Soviet Cybernetics. In 1976 at the age of 84 he applied for political asylum in Sweden. In 1978e published The adventure of cybernetics in the Soviet Union, where he admitted his crimes, shortly before dying in 1979, age 86
