= Pyotr Manteifel =

Soviet zoologist and naturalist

- Пётр Александрович Мантейфель
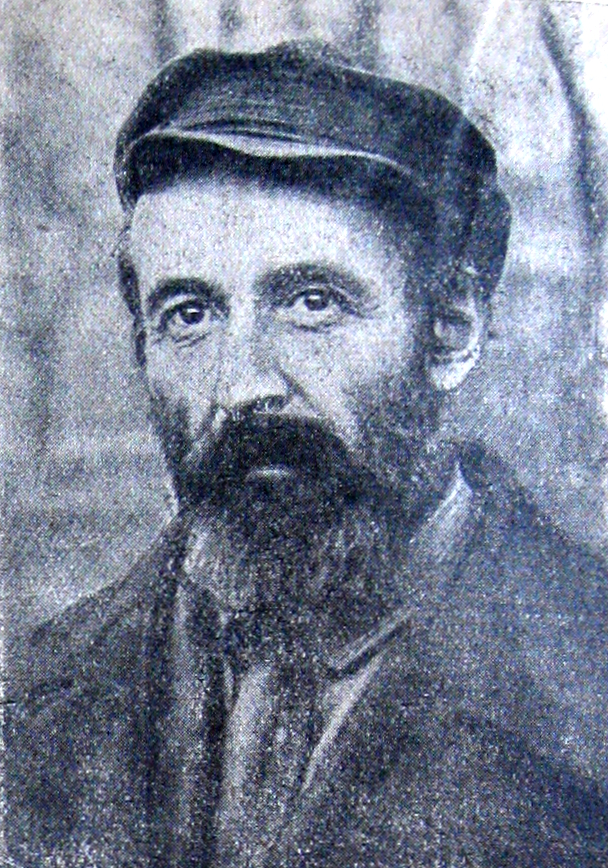
- Manteifel c. 1934
- Born: Pyotr Alexandrovich Manteifel; 30 June 1882; Moscow, Moscow Governorate, Russian Empire
- Died: 24 March 1960 (aged 77); Moscow, Russian SFSR, Soviet Union
- Citizenship: Russian (1882-1922); Soviet (1922-1960)
- Scientific career
- Fields: Natural history, Zoology

Pyotr Alexandrovich Manteifel (also written as Manteuffel) (Russian: Пётр Александрович Мантейфель; June 30, 1882 – March 24, 1960) was a Soviet zoologist and naturalist. He was a popularizer of natural history study and wrote several popular books and organized a circle for young naturalists at the Moscow Zoo called KYuBZ. Here "Uncle Petya" as he was affectionately known became influential in creating a generation of naturalists and zoologists. He was called the "Russian Brehm" by Nikolai Vavilov.

== Early life ==
Manteifel was born in Moscow, scion of the famous Zoege von Manteuffel family of Baltic Germans. His father was the writer, musician and civil servant Alexander Petrovich Zoege von Manteuffel who served as a district justice of peace for thirty years. His mother Anna Prokofievna Pokrovskaya was his first teacher about the plants and animals. Family friends included the Chekhov family. Pyotr spent his childhood in the Vikhrovo estate in Serpukhov district.

== Education ==
In 1902, he graduated from the Voskresensky school and entered the Petrovsk Agricultural Academy for higher studies. In addition to classes at the academy, Manteuffel attended lectures at Moscow University, listening to talks by M. A. Menzbier and K. A. Timiryazev and went on nature expeditions to Central Asia and Central Russia. In 1905, he married Alexandra Yakovlevna née Nikitinskaya (1886 -1961) the daughter of a court official; two years later, they had a son, Boris Manteifel, who became a prominent Soviet biologist.

== Career ==
After graduating with honors in 1910, he became an agronomist and soil scientist. Soon he was called for military service, and in 1914 he was mobilized to the war front; the First World War and the Russian Civil War forced him to interrupt his scientific activities for many years.

In 1924, the director of the Moscow Zoo, M.M. Zavadovsky, invited Manteuffel to head the ornithological section. He was later appointed deputy director for scientific affairs. Manteuffel was a crucial figure behind the formation of the famous KYBZ, or the Circle of Young Biologists of the Zoo, proving himself to be a popular and talented teacher. The pupils called him Uncle; many future scientists, zoologists and naturalists came out of this youth program, among them Nikolai Kalabukhov, Elena Ilyina, Alexander Kuzyakin, Vera Chaplina, Boris Manteifel, Lev Kaplanov, Sergey Folitarek, the brothers Vladimir Grinberg and Yuri Grinberg, Gordey Bromley, Yuri Isakov, Andrey Bannikov, Valent Kucheruk, Sergey Korytin and others.

A key achievement of Manteuffel and his students was the successful breeding of sable in captivity in 1928–29. In 1934–1937, he wrote regularly for Izvestia. At the end of 1937, Manteuffel was forced to leave the zoo after an unsuccessful attempt by a group of workers to remove the new director, L. V. Ostrovsky. After the Second World War, Manteuffel was deputy director for scientific work at the All-Union Scientific Research Institute of Hunting (VNIO) from 1948 to 1955. He also worked in the Presidium of the All-Russian Society for the Conservation of Nature.

Manteuffel was a talented writer and wrote several popular science books. His work was praised by the likes of Konstantin Paustovsky. He was translated into English, German, Bengali, and other Indian languages, by the state translating houses Progress Publishers and Raduga Publishers.

- "Stories of a Naturalist" (1937)
- "In the Taiga and in the Steppe. Essays and Stories "(1939)"
- "Notes of a Naturalist "(1961).

== Death ==
He died in 1960 and was buried at the Lublin cemetery in Moscow.
