= Alexei Tsvetkov =

Alexei Tsvetkov may refer to:

- Alexei Tsvetkov (poet) (1947–2022), Russian poet and essayist
- Alexei Tsvetkov (sculptor) (1924–2009), Russian sculptor
- Alexei Tsvetkov (ice hockey) (born 1981), Russian ice hockey forward

== See also ==
- Alexander Tsvetkov (1914–1990), Bulgarian chess master
