= Georgy Alexievich Skrebitsky =

Soviet writer and naturalist

Georgy Alexievich Skrebitsky (1903-1964) was a Soviet writer and naturalist. He was born in Moscow, the son of a doctor. He grew up in the town of Chern in Tula province. In 1921, he graduated from high school and went to study in Moscow. After completing his studies from Institute of Words, he eneted the faculty of hunting and animal husbandry at the Moscow Higher Zootechnical Institute to study more thoroughly the natural world. He graduated from the Zoo Institute in 1930, and went to work in zoology at state institutes such as the Moscow State University.

From the late 1930s onwards, he became much more focused on writing. In 1939, his film script was turned into a popular science film The Island of White Birds, based on a scientific expedition to the bird nesting sites of the White Sea. At the same time, he published his first story "Ushan". From the 1940s until his death, he published more than two dozen books for children, many of them centered around Russian nature and wildlife, usually brought out by DETGIZ, the state publishing house for children's books. He also co-authored books and films with the animal writer Vera Chaplina.

He was married to the scientist Tatiana Ivanovna Bibikova (1907-1977), and they had two children - Vladimir Georgievich Skrebitsky, a noted scientist and writer, and Ivan Georgievich Skrebitsky (1942-1975).
