= Vladimir Mitkevich =

Russian scientist and electrical engineer

Vladimir Fyodorovich Mitkevich
- Владимир Фёдорович Миткевич;
- Born: August 3, 1872; Minsk
- Died: June 1, 1951 (aged 78); Moscow
- Occupation(s): Scientist, engineer

Vladimir Fyodorovich Mitkevich (Russian: Владимир Фёдорович Миткевич; 3 August 1872, Minsk – 1 June 1951, Moscow) was a Soviet scientist and electrical engineer.

In 1929, Mitkevich participated in the Second International Congress of the History of Science held in London in June–July 1931.
