= Dieter Wittich =

German epistemologist and Marxist philosopher (1930–2011)

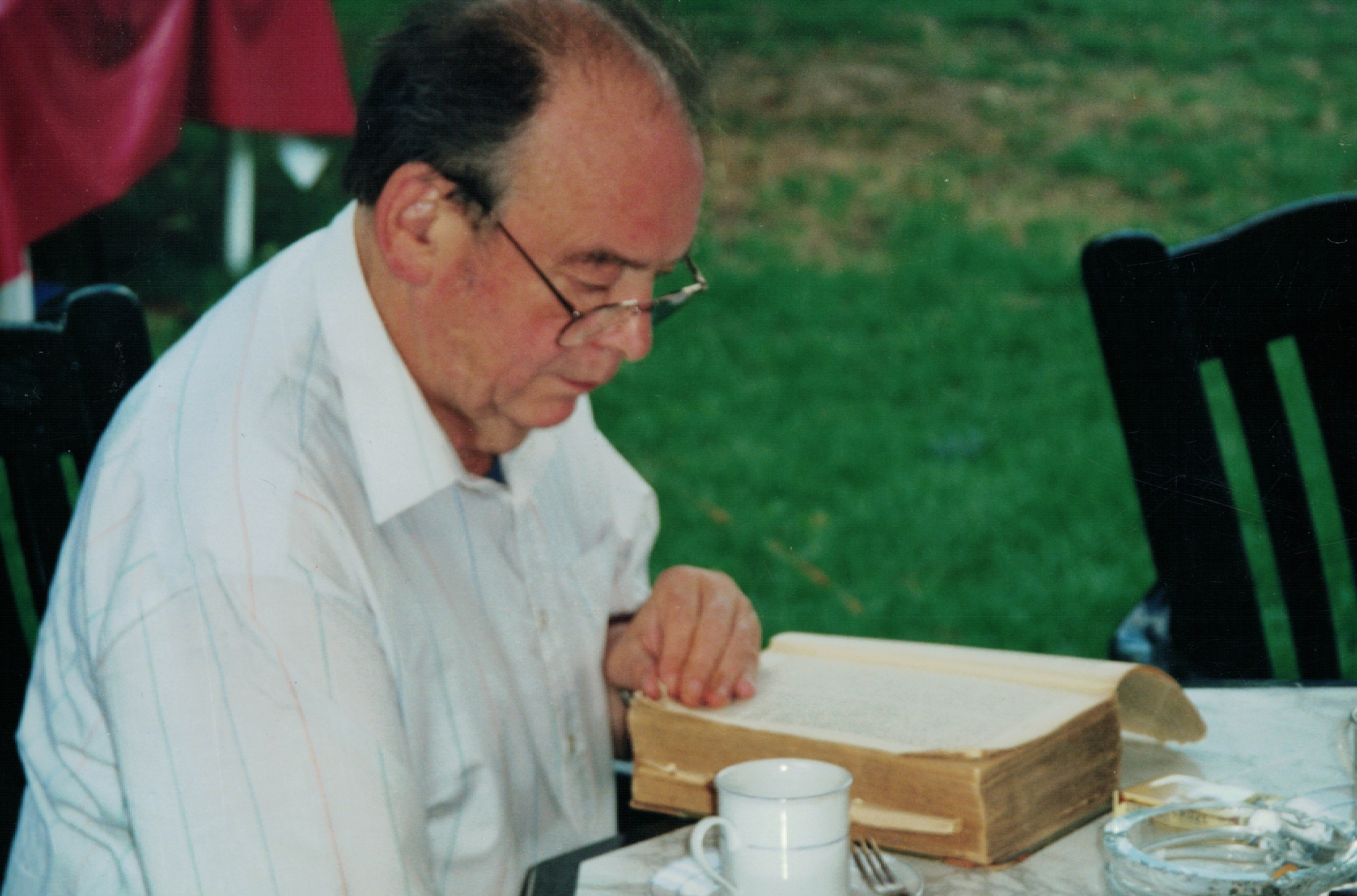
Dieter Wittich

Dieter Wittich (born 7 February 1930 in Mansbach; died 22 June 2011 in Strausberg) was a German philosopher. From 1966, he taught at the Karl Marx University of Leipzig, where he held the only chair in epistemology that existed in the German Democratic Republic (GDR).

== Life ==
Raised in Schmalkalden in the Thuringian Forest, Wittich studied under Georg Klaus, first at the Friedrich Schiller University Jena and, from 1953, at the Humboldt University. In 1960 he earned his doctorate with a dissertation on the controversy over materialism and began lecturing on Marxist–Leninist epistemology the same year. From 1966, Wittich taught at the Karl Marx University in Leipzig, where he held the GDR’s only chair in epistemology. From 1974 to 1990, he served as dean of the Faculty of Philosophy and Humanities, retiring in 1995.

Wittich published approximately 150 scholarly works, both in the GDR and internationally, including in the United States, England, Austria, and Colombia. He was an expert on contemporary, non-Marxist philosophy of science in the Anglo-Saxon world. In 1979, he became a member of the Saxon Academy of Sciences and Humanities, and in 1995, of the Leibniz Society of Sciences at Berlin.

According to Heinrich Opitz, Wittich founded the “Leipzig school of epistemology” in the 1960s, which sought to systematically compile the scattered remarks of Karl Marx and Friedrich Engels on epistemology. Through this effort, Opitz argued, Marxist epistemology “regained its genuinely appropriate place within the system of Marxist philosophy.”

== Selected works ==
- Translation from Russian authorized by Georg Klaus: Ernst Kolman, Was ist Kybernetik. Verlag Junge Welt, Berlin 1955 (supplement to Forum, 1955, no. 23)
- Der deutsche kleinbürgerliche Materialismus der Reaktionsjahre nach 1848/49. Unter besonderer Berücksichtigung des naturhistorischen Materialismus Ludwig Büchners. Dissertation, unpublished, Berlin 1960
- Die materialistische Erkenntnistheorie. Humboldt-Universität, Berlin 1962, 2nd ed., Heft 4 of: Dialektischer Materialismus. Fernstudium Philosophie
- Praxis, Erkenntnis, Wissenschaft. Deutscher Verlag der Wissenschaft, Berlin 1965
- Erkenntnistheorie. Studienanleitung. Institut für Philosophie der Humboldt-Universität, Berlin 1965
- Zu Fragen der marxistischen Praxisbestimmung und des Verhältnisses von Praxis und Erkenntnis. Habilitation thesis, Humboldt-Universität, Berlin 1966
- With Reinhold Miller, editor of Die Sozialistische Weltanschauung, Volk und Wissen, Berlin 1966 (3rd ed., vol. 3 of Staatsbürgerkunde)
- Editor and introduction: Carl Vogt, Jakob Moleschott, and Ludwig Büchner, Schriften zum kleinbürgerlichen Materialismus in Deutschland, 2 vols., Akademie, Berlin 1971 (Philosophische Studientexte 38)
- Über Gegenstand und Methoden der marxistisch-leninistischen Erkenntnistheorie, Deutscher Verlag der Wissenschaft, Berlin 1973
- With Klaus Gössler and Kurt Wagner: Marxistisch-leninistische Erkenntnistheorie. 2nd ed. (1st ed. 1978), Deutscher Verlag der Wissenschaft, Berlin 1980
- Gedanken zum Werk von Karl Marx in seiner Bedeutung für die sozialistische Hochschulpolitik. Karl-Marx-Universität, Leipzig 1983 (Leipziger Universitätsreden, Neue Folge, Heft 64)
- Warum und wie Lenins philosophisches Hauptwerk entstand. Entstehung, Methodik und Rezeption von „Materialismus und Empiriokritizismus“. Dietz, Berlin 1985 (Grundfragen der marxistisch-leninistischen Philosophie)
- Zur Entstehungs- und Rezeptionsgeschichte von W. I. Lenins Werk „Materialismus und Empiriokritizismus“. Akademie, Berlin 1986, ISBN 3-05-000069-4 (Sitzungsberichte der Sächsischen Akademie der Wissenschaften zu Leipzig, Philologisch-Historische Klasse, vol. 127, no. 2)
- With Horst Poldrack: Der Londoner Kongress zur Wissenschaftsgeschichte 1931 und das Problem der Determination von Erkenntnisentwicklung. Akademie, Berlin 1990, ISBN 3-05-001062-2 (Sitzungsberichte der Sächsischen Akademie der Wissenschaften zu Leipzig, Philologisch-Historische Klasse, vol. 130, no. 5)
- With Helmut Seidel and Volker Caysa: Zum philosophischen Praxis-Begriff. Die zweite Praxis-Diskussion in der DDR. Texte zur Philosophie Heft 12, Rosa-Luxemburg-Stiftung Sachsen, 2002.

== Bibliography ==
- Monika Runge: Erkenntnistheorie in Leipzig: ein Beitrag zur Universitäts- und Philosophiegeschichte. Dieter Wittich zum 75. Geburtstag. Rosa-Luxemburg-Stiftung Sachsen, Leipzig 2006, ISBN 3-89819-249-0
- Hans-Christoph Rauh. "Wittich, Dieter" [Wittich, Dieter]. DDR-Lexikon.
- Martin Küpper: Die Mühen der Erkenntnis. Zum zehnten Todestag des Philosophen Dieter Wittich. Academia.edu, 22 June 2021.
