= Moscow Zoo =

Zoo in Russia

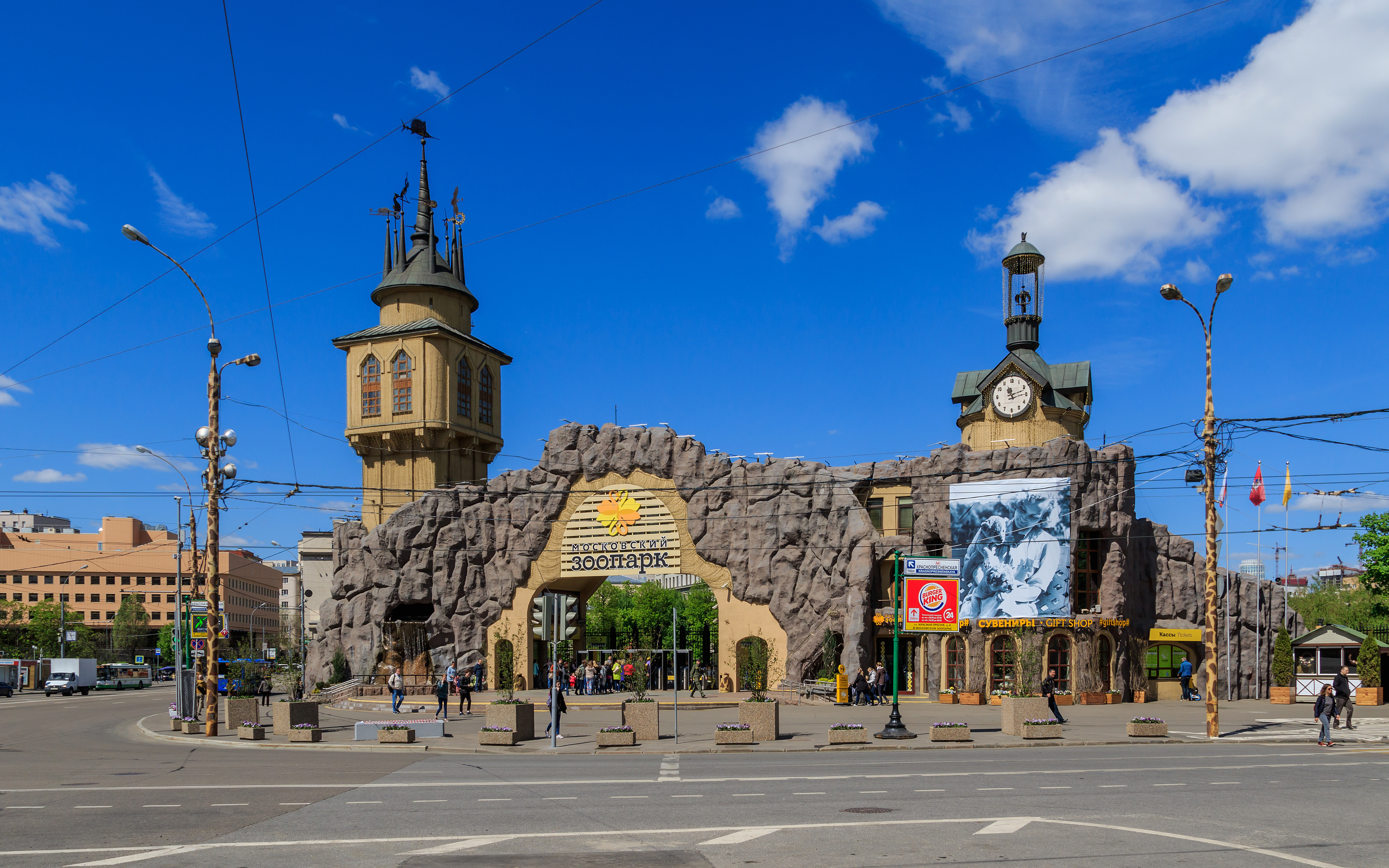
- The Moscow Zoo entrance.
- Interactive map of Moscow Zoo
- 55°45′43″N 37°34′38″E
- Date opened: 31 January 1864; 162 years ago
- Location: Moscow, Russia
- Land area: 21.5 ha (53 acres)
- No. of animals: 10,531 (2019)
- No. of species: 1,267 (2019)
- Memberships: EARAZA, EAZA, WAZA
- Public transit: Barrikadnaya; Krasnopresnenskaya
- Website: http://moscowzoo.ru/

The Moscow Zoo or Moskovsky Zoopark (Russian: Московский зоопарк) is a 21.5-hectare (53-acre) zoo, one of the largest in Russia and one of the oldest in Europe.

== History ==
The Moscow Zoo was founded in 1864 by professor-biologists, K.F. Rulje, S.A. Usov and A.P. Bogdanov, from the Moscow State University. In 1919, the zoo was nationalized. In 1922, the ownership was transferred to the Government of Moscow and has remained under their control ever since.

The zoo had an area of 10 hectares (25 acres) when it first opened, with 286 animals. In 1926, the zoo was expanded to adjacent lands, increasing the area to 18 hectares (44 acres).

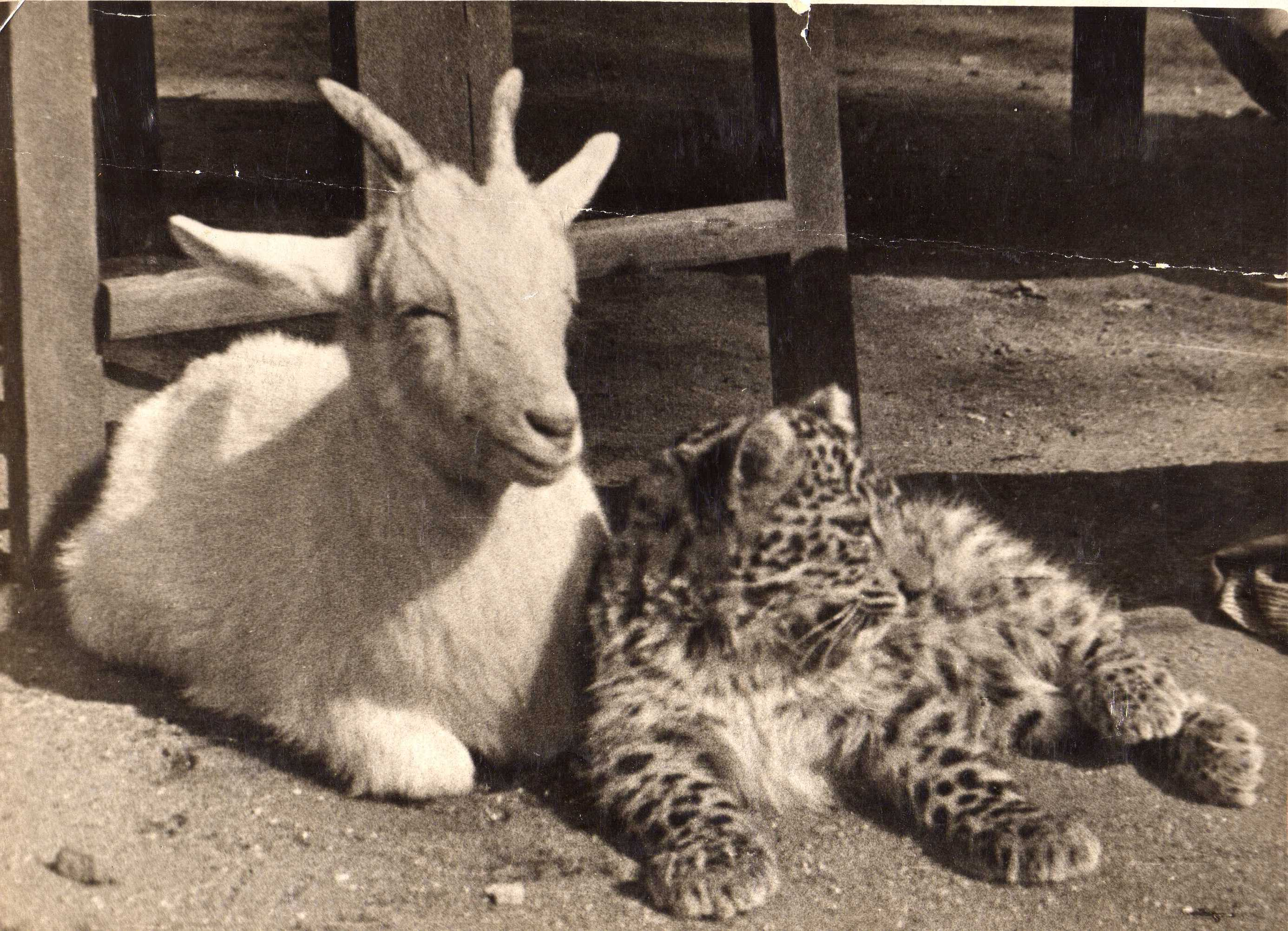
The "green platform" (1937)

In 1933, Vera Chaplina, a naturalist and future writer, created the "green platform", a special enclosure for young animals where different cubs that their mothers refused to feed were not only raised, but also taught to live peacefully together. This experiment aroused great interest among visitors, and for many years the "green platform" remained one of the Moscow Zoo's main attractions.

In 1990, the zoo was renovated. Notable additions include a new main entrance in the shape of a large rock castle, and a footbridge that connected the old (1864) and new (1926) properties of the zoo.

In addition, the zoo was expanded once more. New exhibits were opened including a sea aquarium, an aviary, a creatures of the night exhibit, a sea lion exhibit and a section aimed at children.

The Moscow zoo has over 7,500 animals representing about 1,000 species and covers an area of about 21.5 hectares (53 acres).

== Moscow Zoo Museum ==
Founded in 2008 in a two-storey building of the 19th century, built in the late XIX - early XX centuries, located on the territory of the zoo. Since 2015, the museum has been open to the public and everyone. In the central and side halls, there is an exposition devoted to the history of the Moscow Zoo and a natural science permanent exposition. The collection of the museum includes more than 10,000 zoo coats of arms from all over the world, hundreds of paintings, sculptures, and drawings by the masters of Russian animalistics, such as Vasily Vatagin, Alexei Komarov, Vadim Trofimov, Andrei Marts and Alexei Tsvetkov.

== Research & Educational Center ==
The Moscow Zoo has its own educational institute and research center. In addition to full training for zoo staff and teachers, there is a continuing education program for zoo and aquarium staff, veterinarians, teachers and volunteers, as well as courses in zoo psychology. Since the Moscow Zoo has been chairman of all zoos in Russia since the Soviet period, it is a national training center. This was founded in 2017 by the current director Svetlana Akulova and Björn Stenvers.

== Animals & Exhibits ==
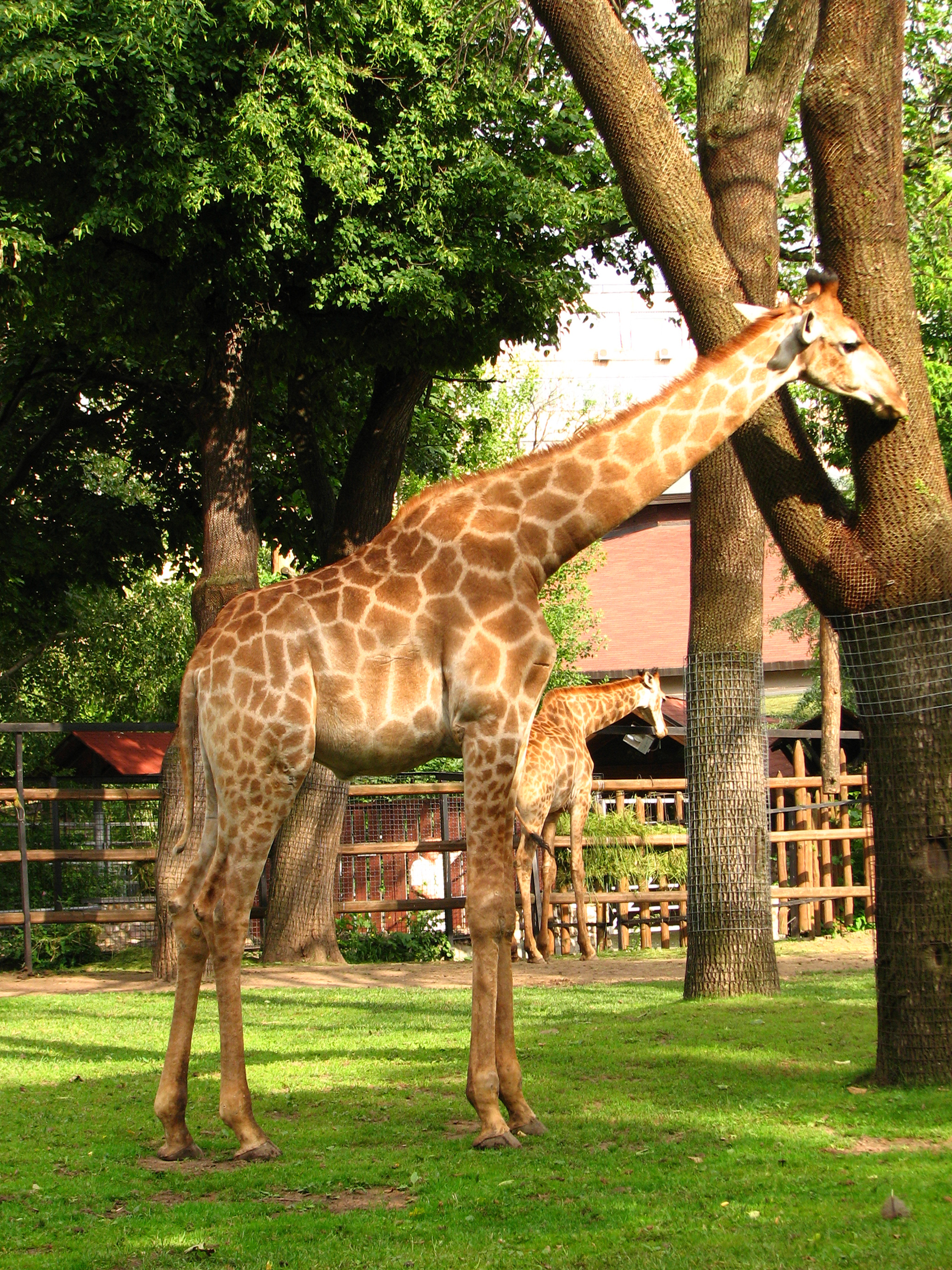
Reticulated giraffe at Moscow Zoo

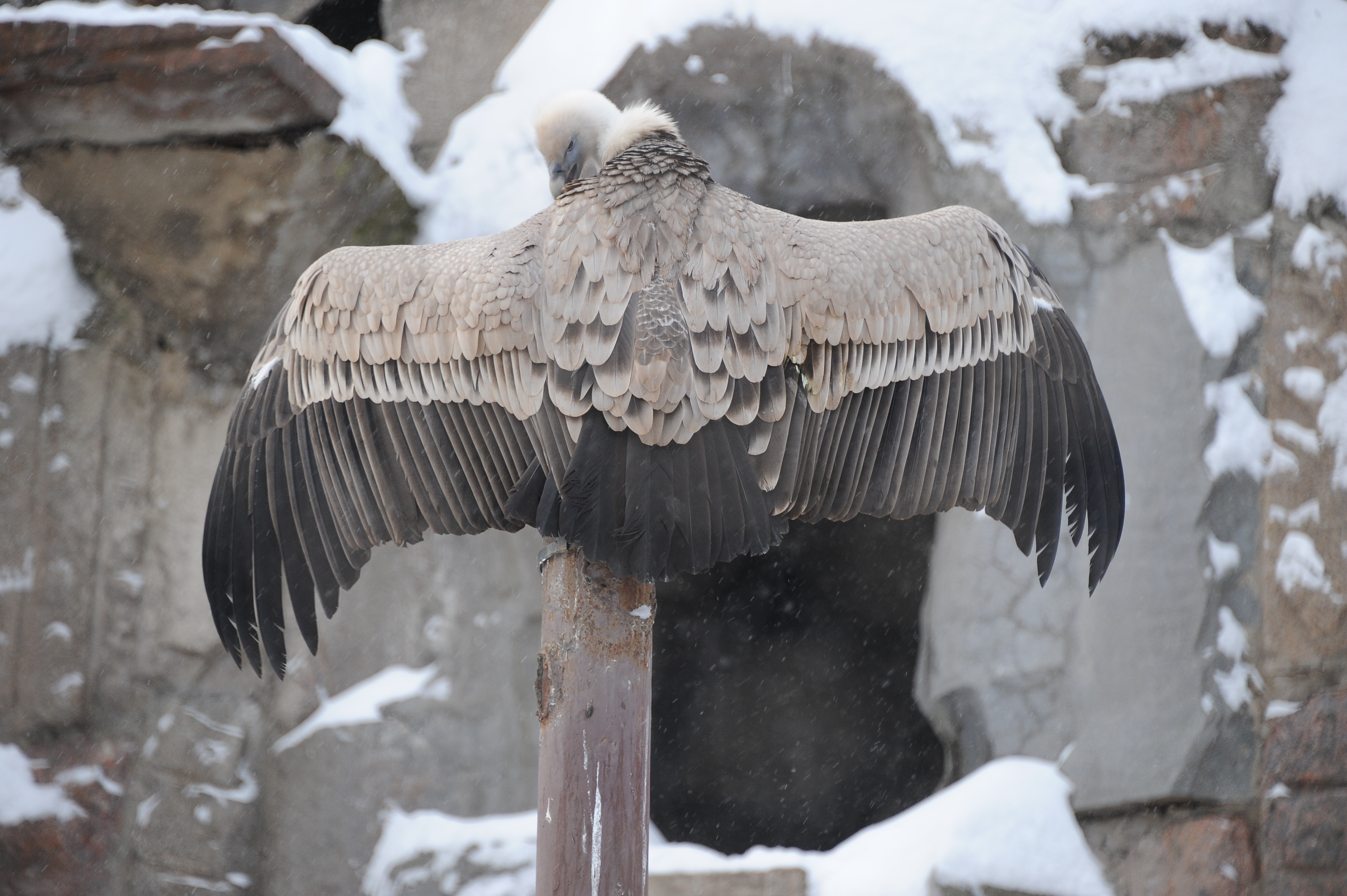
Vulture at Moscow Zoo

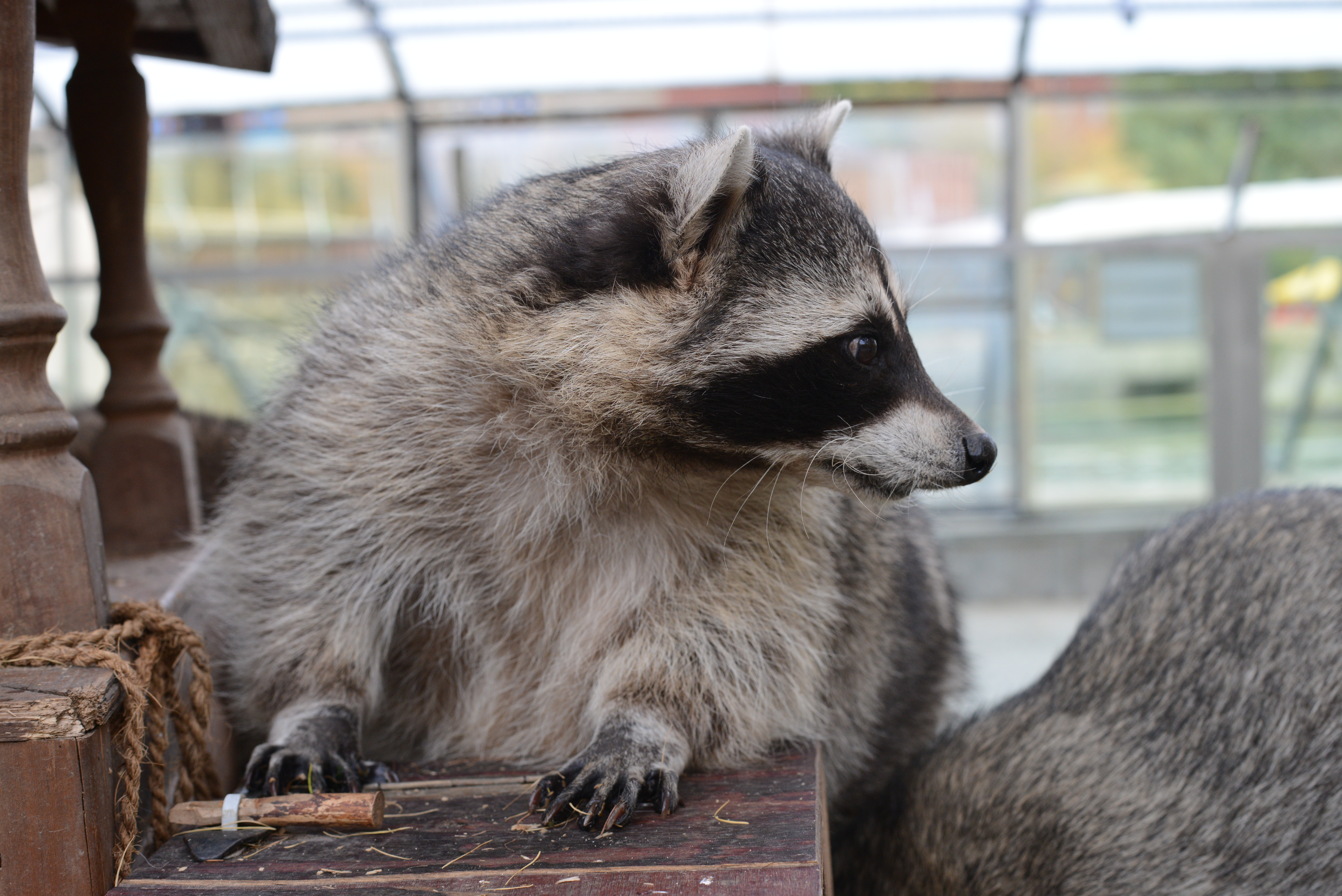
Raccoon

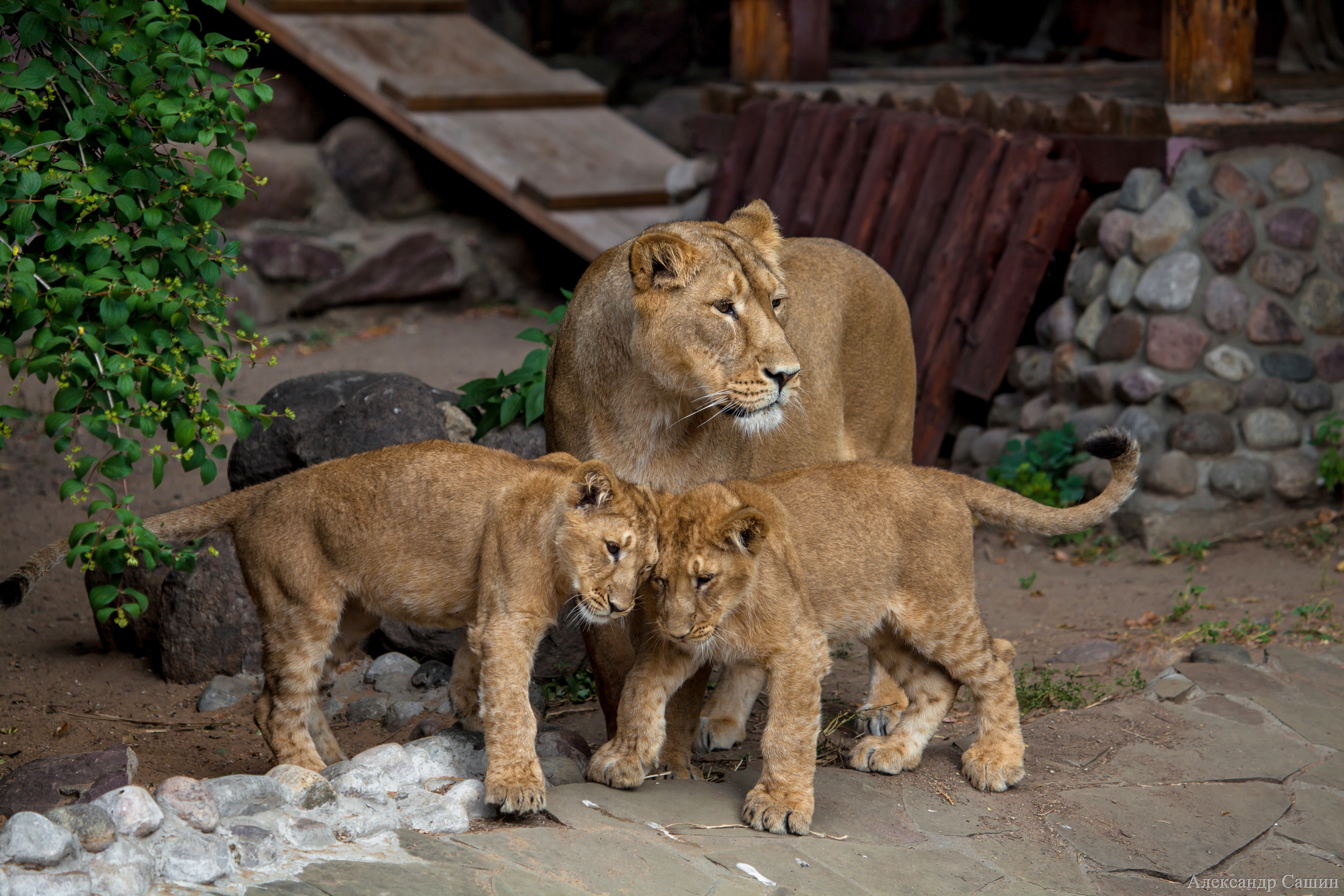
Lions at Moscow zoo

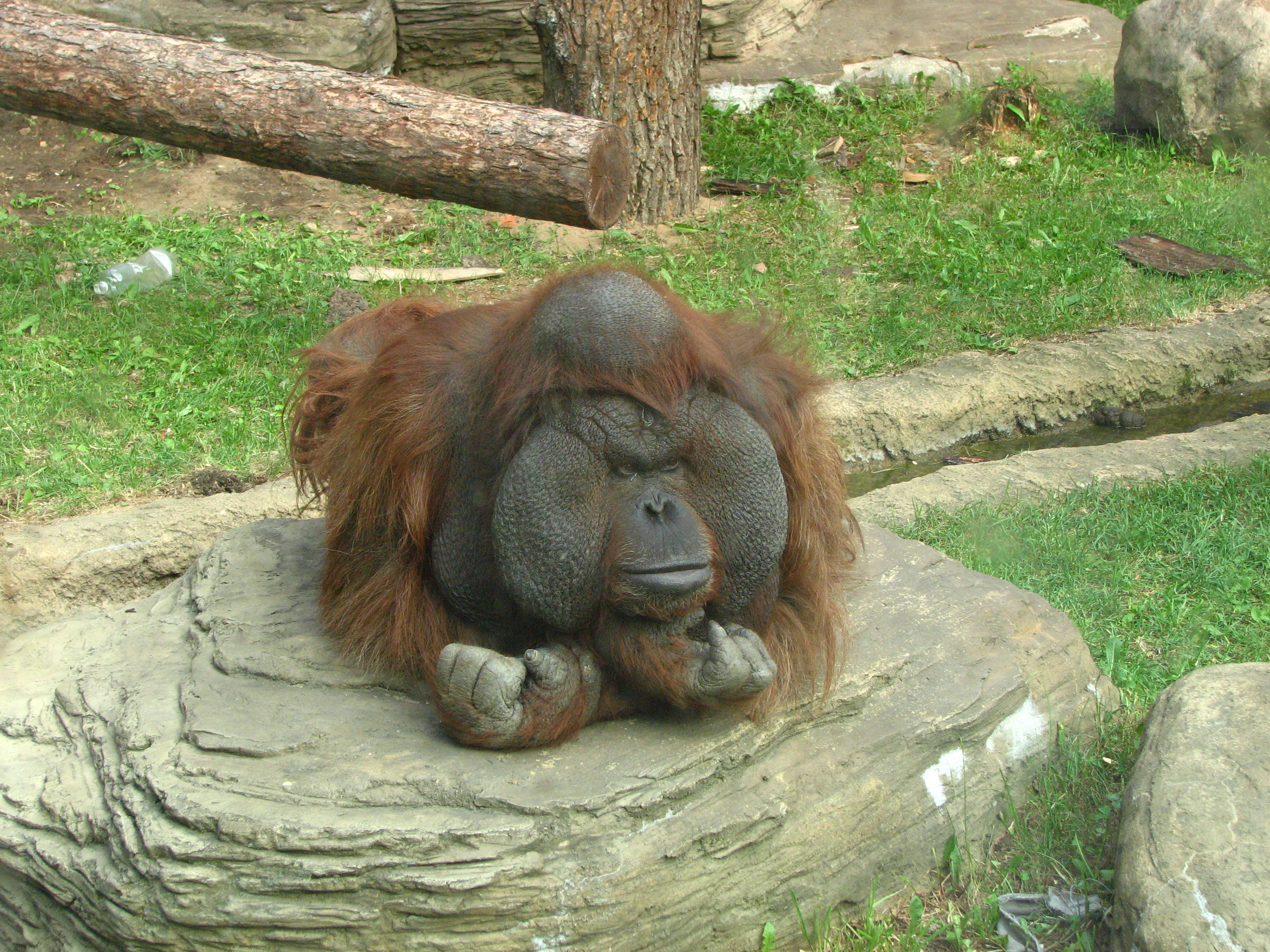
Orangutan

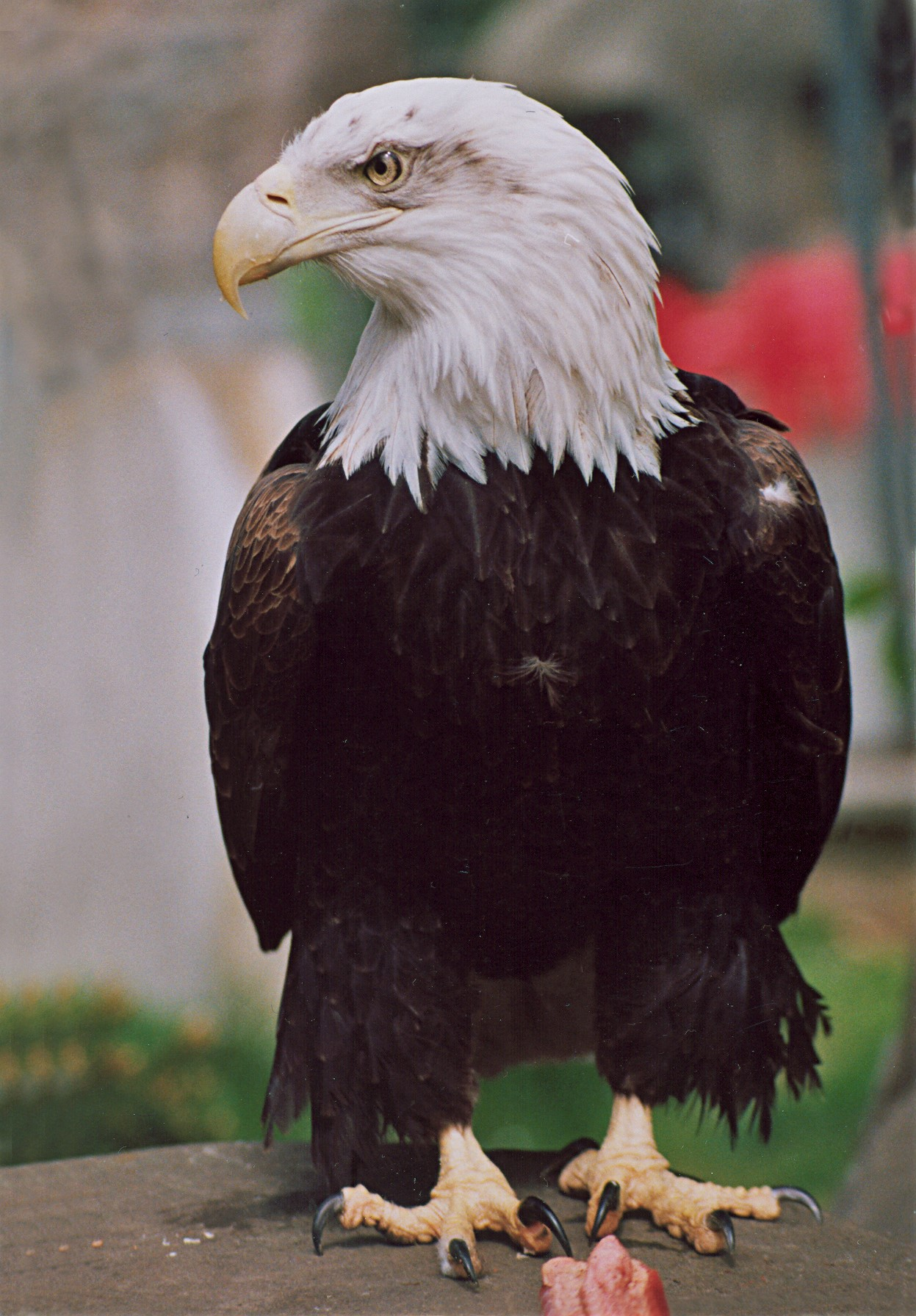
Bald eagle

China News Service video on Russia's first giant panda cub.

=== Old Territory exhibits ===
==== Flamingo Pond ====
- Greater flamingo
- American flamingo

==== Black bears ====
- Asian black bear

==== Fauna of China ====
- Giant panda

==== Bird World ====
- Scarlet Macaw
- Green-winged Macaw
- Military Macaw
- Blue-and-Yellow Macaw
- Blue-throated Macaw
- Yellow-faced Amazon
- Umbrella Cockatoo
- Sulphur-crested Cockatoo
- Cockatiel
- Budgerigar
- Eclectus Parrot

==== Elephant Museum ====
- Indian elephant
- Bush hyrax

=== New Territory exhibits ===
==== Animal Island ====
Outdoors:

- Asiatic lion
- Spotted hyena
- Kamchatka brown bear
- Golden jackal
- Sloth bear
- Striped hyena
- Siberian tiger

Indoors (Exotarium):

==== Polar World ====
- Polar bear

==== Tur Hill ====
- East Caucasian tur

==== Animals of Africa ====
- South African giraffe
- Grévy's zebra
- Common ostrich
- Slender-tailed meerkat
- Sable antelope
- Kirk's dik-dik
- Honey badger

==== Other Animals ====
- Golden eagle
- Bald eagle
- Griffin vulture

=== Former exhibits ===
==== Dolphinarium ====
From 2001 to 2014, the Moscow Zoo Dolphinarium operated on the grounds of the zoo's old territory. The exhibit was dismantled following unsanitary conditions and improper husbandry procedures.

- Beluga whale
- Common bottlenose dolphin

== Directors ==
Directors of the zoo have included:

- Yakov Kalinovsky (1864–1867)
- Sergey Usov (1867–1873)
- Alexandr Maklakov (1878–1880)
- Vladimir Popov (1878–1881)
- Alexandr Chelyukanov (1881–1883)
- Vladimir Wagner (1883–1886)
- Nikolai Kulagin (1889–1894)
- Alexandr Walter (1894–1895)
- Ippolit Antushevich (1895–1904)
- Vladislav Pogorzhelsky (1904–1917)
- Yury Belogolovy (1917–1919)
- Aleksandr Kots (1919–1924)
- Mikhail Zavadovsky (1924–1928)
- Sergey Novikov (1928–1932)
- Yevgeny Klimek (1932–1936)
- Lev Ostrovsky (1936–1940)
- Trofim Burdelev (1940–1950)
- Sergey Butygin (1950–1951)
- Igor Sosnovsky (1951–1977)
- Vladimir Vladimirovich Spitsin (1977–2013)
- Natalya Kolobova (2013–2016)
- Svetlana Akulova (2016–)

== Sources ==
- Vera Chaplina True Stories from the Moscow Zoo (1970) Englewood Cliffs, New Jersey; Prentice-Hall, Inc. P. 152 (translated by Lila Pargment, Estel Titiev).
- Egorova, L. V., ed. (2004). The Moscow Zoo: History and 140th anniversary (Московский зоологический парк. К 140-летию со дня основания. Страницы истории). Moscow: Ellis Luck 2000. ISBN 978-5-902152-16-3. (in Russian)
