= Gary Werskey =

Historian of science

- Education: Northwestern University; Harvard University
- Scientific career
- Fields: History of science
- Workplaces: Edinburgh University; University of Bath; Imperial College London; University of New South Wales

Gary Werskey is a biographer and cultural historian of art and science. He graduated from Northwestern University in 1965, majoring in History (BA, with distinction). He entered Harvard University's Graduate School of Arts & Sciences in the same year as a Woodrow Wilson Fellow. After taking his MA in History in 1966, he embarked on his doctoral studies as a Wilson Dissertation Fellow and was awarded his PhD in History in 1973.

In the first phase of his career Werskey was based in the UK between 1970 and 1986, teaching at the Universities of Edinburgh and Bath before joining the Industrial Sociology Unit at Imperial College in 1978. His research focused primarily on the relationship between Marxism and science. He provided a new introduction to Science at the Crossroads when it was republished in 1971, and published his The Visible College: A Collective Biography of British Scientists and Socialists of the 1930s in 1978 (reprinted in 1988). Werskey was also a member of the Radical Science Journal and later discussed this experience in his memoir "Marxist critiques of capitalist science -–A history in three movements?" Here he discussed two British radical science movements firstly in the 1930s–40s, and secondly in the 1960s–70s, and speculated about the possibilities of a third movement.

While at Imperial College, Werskey developed a new interest in comparative engineering education, which led him to undertake research on how the training and career development of Japanese engineers contrasted with that of their British counterparts. It was this work which prepared him for taking up the position of Director of Professional Studies in the University of New South Wales's Faculty of Engineering in 1987. There he created the UNSW Co-op Program to attract high-achieving students into engineering and applied science courses before working across several faculties to launch an innovative online post-graduate course, the 'MBT' (Master of Business & Technology). Thirty years later, both of these programs are still going strong. Following a stint as UNSW's Director of External Affairs, Werskey left the university to work as a management consultant, co-founding The Leading Partnership, from which he retired in the early 2000s.

In 2009 Werskey co-founded the Blackheath History Forum to encourage the discussion and popularization of important debates in Australian history. For the next decade he turned his attention to the field of Australian art history between the 1880s and the 1920s. His research has been supported by the University of Sydney's Department of History in the School of Philosophical & Historical Inquiry, where he is currently an Hon. Associate. His research has culminated in 2021 with both the publication by NewSouth Books of his Picturing a Nation: The Art & Life of A.H. Fullwood and the launch of an exhibition at the National Library of Australia in Canberra -- A Nation Imagined: The Artists of the Picturesque Atlas—which he has co-curated with the Art Gallery of NSW's Curator of Australian & Pacific Art, Natalie Wilson. This show will run from March 12 to July 11, 2021.
