= International Committee of History of Science =

The International Committee of History of Science (French: Comité International des Sciences Historiques), abbreviated as CISH, is an is a non-governmental, non-profit organisation, created to promote the historical sciences through international co-operation. It was founded in May 14, 1926, and is based in Geneva. The Committee consists of historical research committees at the national level, and international-affiliated organisations focusing on the same.

The Committee holds a general assembly biannually. They organised the First International Congress of History of Science in Paris in 1929. They held the Second International Congress of the History of Science in London in 1931, where they transformed themselves into the International Academy of the History of Science, which was based on individual membership.
