= Boris Zavadovsky =

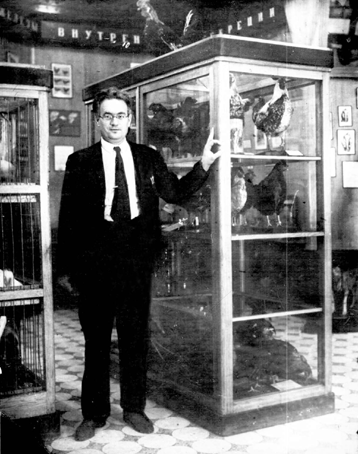
Boris Zavadovsky alongside a display at the K. A. Timiryazev Biology Museum

Boris Mikhailovich Zavadovsky (Russian: Борис Михайлович Завадовский; 13 January 1895, Elisavetgrad – 31 March 1951, Moscow) was a Russian Soviet physiologist and who founded the K. A. Timiryazev Biology Museum in 1922. He is noted for his pioneering research into the function of the thyroid gland. He also studied the effects of sex hormones on the body.

He developed a Marxist approach to museology which he described in "Marxist Exhibition Methods for Natural Science Museums" (1931) which he presented at the First All-Russian Museum Congress held in Moscow in 1930.

He also attended the Second International Congress of the History of Science as part of the Soviet delegation contributing "The "Physical" and "Biological" in the Process of Organic Evolution"" to the anthology of their contributions Science at the Crossroads. At the time he was one of two non-party members of the delegation, but he joined the Communist Party in 1932.

Although Zavadovsky considered himself a Marxist biologist, he was an open critic of Trofim Lysenko during the Lysenko affair.
