= Vera Chaplina =

Soviet children's literature writer and naturalist

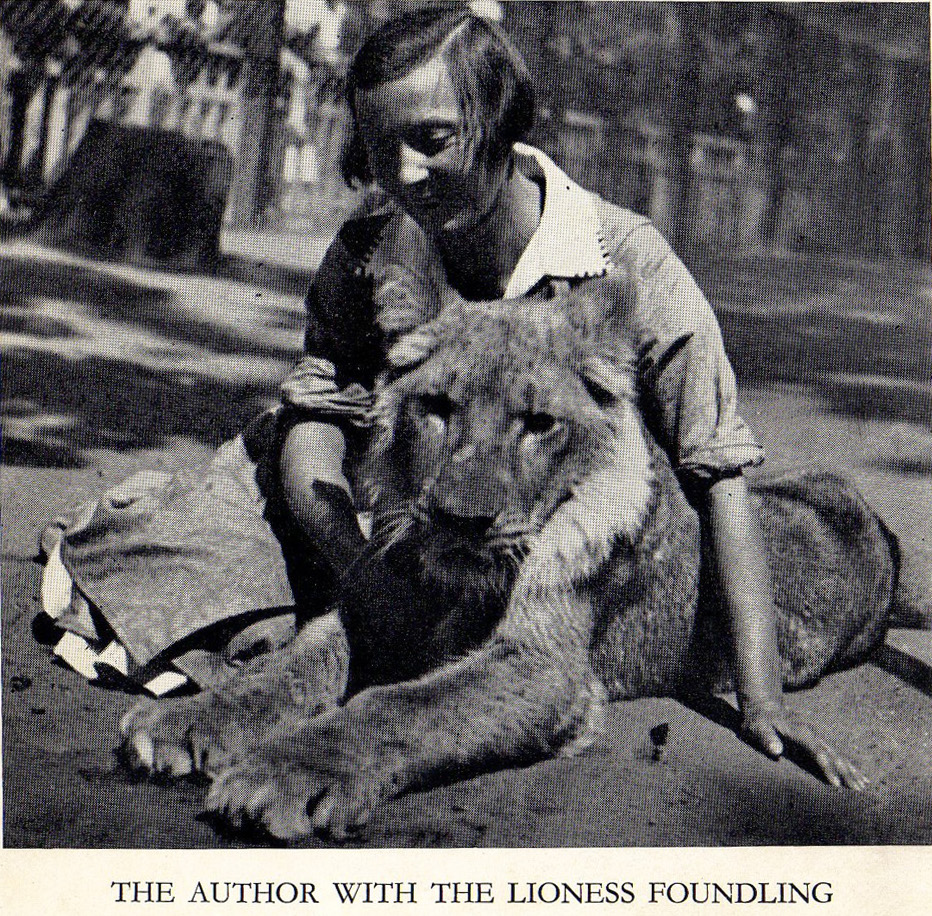
- Vera Chaplina with the lioness Kinuli (Foundling). The Moscow Zoo, 1936
- Born: Vera Vasilievna Chaplina; 24 April 1908; Moscow, Russian Empire
- Died: 19 December 1994 (aged 86); Moscow, Russian Federation
- Resting place: Vagankovo Cemetery, Moscow

Vera Vasilievna Chaplina (Russian: Вера Васильевна Чаплина; 24 April 1908 – 19 December 1994) was a Soviet children's literature writer and naturalist.

== Biography ==
Vera Chaplina was born in Moscow, her grandfather, Vladimir Chaplin, was an engineer, professor and educator of the architect Melnikov. After the Revolution of 1917, 10-year-old Vera was lost and spent several years in an orphanage in Tashkent. In 1923 she returned to Moscow. Her career at the Moscow Zoo began when she was sixteen years old. Chaplina visited the zoo as often as she could and was particularly attracted, as many children are, by the cubs. She appeared so often and stayed so long that she finally attracted the attention of professor Pyotr Manteifel, the zoo's principal naturalist, and he asked her if she would like to become a junior helper. She gladly accepted the offer, and from that time worked daily in the zoo. In 1924 she entered the Young Biologists' Circle at the Moscow Zoo.

Vera Chaplina's special interest was the baby animals, and in 1933 she was put in charge of the zoo's motherless youngsters. In 1937 she became chief of one of the zoo's largest departments, the wild animals section Moscow Zoo.

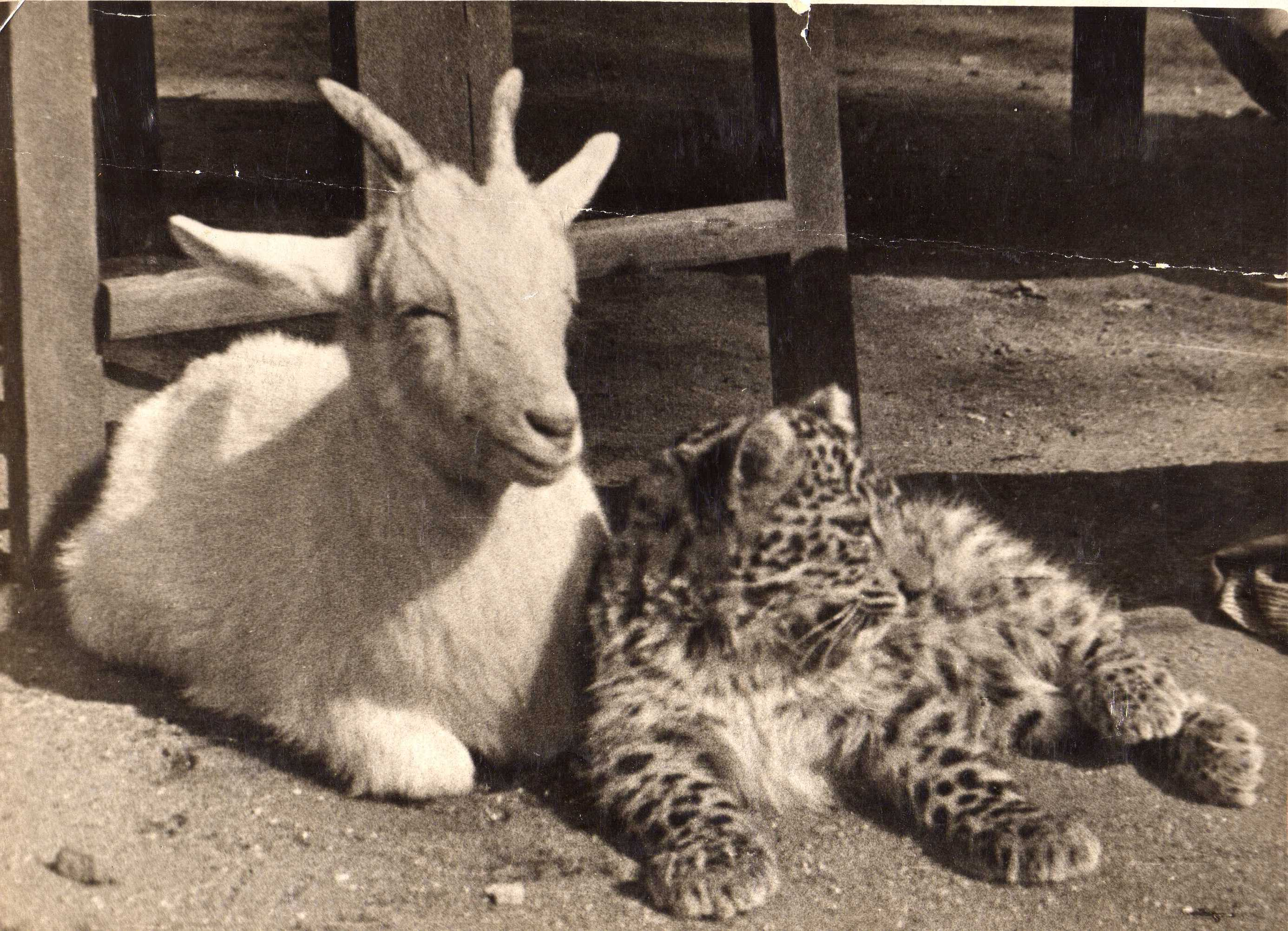
Pupils of Vera Chaplina at the Enclosure for baby animals. Moscow Zoo, 1937

Over the years Vera Chaplina and her family played host at home to a number of animals — wolves, a leopard, a lynx and a lion cub named Kinuli. Kinuli in Russian means “was abandoned”, as the cub had been abandoned by her mother. Vera Chaplina saved the cub. She took it home. fed it from a bottle, nursed it through its first days. And so Kinuli came to be raised in a Moscow apartment in the middle 1930s with Chaplina, her husband, young son and brother — and an assortment of neighbors and their children the growing lioness. Kinuli's story glows with Mrs. Chaplina's love of animals, and her desire to unstill something of this feeling in her readers.

Vera Chaplina's first book about baby animals Cubs from the green enclosure (Malyshi s zelenoĭ proshchadki), was first published in Russian in 1935. Since then, she wrote many children's books about animals, including My animal pupils (1937; Мои воспитанники), Four-legged friends (1949; Четвероногие друзья), Pupils of the Zoo (1955—1965; Питомцы зоопарка), Casual encounters (1976; Случайные встречи). “Chaplina`s writing is affectionate, but is not sentimental.” “The writing is straightforward and simple, the author`s attitude toward the creatures she cared for both tender and practical.”

Vera Chaplina worked at the Moscow Zoo until 1946, writing stories when she could find the time. Since then she has devoted more time to literary pursuits and became a full-time writer. Chaplina's stories were translated into English, German, French, Spanish, Portuguese, Japanese Chinese, Hebrew, Polish, Czech, Hungarian, Latvian, Estonian, Romanian, Danish, Swedish, and Serbian.

== Selected works ==
- My animal friends (1939) London; George Routledge & Sons Ltd. P. 255 (translated by Stephen Garry)
- Zoo babies (1956) Moscow; Foreign Languages Publishing House. P. 208 (translated by Ivy Litvinova)
- Scamp and Crybaby (1959) Moscow; Foreign Languages Publishing House. P. 24 (translated by Ivy Litvinova)
- Kinuli (1965) New York; Henry Z.Walck, Inc. P. 95 (translated by Ivy Litvinova)
- True Stories from the Moscow Zoo (1970) Englewood Cliffs, New Jersey; Prentice-Hall, Inc. P. 152 (translated by Lila Pargment, Estel Titiev)
- Forest travelers. A film story (1972) Moscow; Union of Soviet film workers. P. 24 (translated by Faina Glagoleva)
- The birds in our wood (1984) Moscow; Malysh Publishers. P. 10 (translated by V.Korotky)

== Script author ==
- Kinuli — documentary film (1935, Кинули; Mostehfilm)
- Adventures of a bear cub — comedy film (1936, Похождения медвежонка; Mezhrabpomfilm)
- Instinct in animal behavior — documentary film (1940, Инстинкт в поведении животных; Mostehfilm)
- Forest travelers — animated film (1951, Лесные путешественники; with G. Skrebitskiy; Soyuzmultfilm)
- In the Heart of the Forest — animated film (1954, В лесной чаще; with G. Skrebitskiy; Soyuzmultfilm)
