= Mikhail Zavadovsky =

Russian and Soviet biologist

- Born: Mиxaил Mиxaйлoвич Зaвaдoвcкий; 29 July 1891; Pokrovka-Skorichevo, Yelisavetgradsky Uyezd (now in Ukraine)
- Died: 28 March 1957 (aged 65); Moscow
- Education: St. Petersburg Polytechnic Institute, Moscow University
- Known for: Increased fertility of farm animals
- Relatives: Boris Zavadovsky (brother)
- Scientific career
- Fields: Reproductive biology of livestock
- Workplaces: Shanyavsky Moscow City People's University; Moscow State University; Taurida University, Ukraine

Mikhail Mikhailovich Zavadovsky (Russian: Mиxaил Mиxaйлoвич Зaвaдoвcкий; 29 July 1891 – 28 March 1957) was a Russian and Soviet biologist who specialized in the reproductive biology of livestock. A professor at Moscow University, he conducted experiments on sex hormones, the control of sexual characters and hormonal cycles. He noted that there was a balance between the sex hormones and was able to produce male or female characteristics during development by altering the balance experimentally. He termed them plus-minus interactions. Zavadovsky introduced the term "biotechnology" in 1932. His brother Boris Mikhailovich (1895–1951) also worked on endocrinology.

Zavadovsky was born at Pokrovka-Skorichevo, Yelisavetgradsky Uyezd (now in Ukraine) in the landed family of Mikhail and Maria née Kotsiubinsky. He went to study at the St. Petersburg Polytechnic Institute in 1909 and transferred to Moscow University studying in the laboratory of Nikolai Koltsov. After receiving a diploma he worked at the low temperature laboratory as an assistant. In 1915 he was an assistant to Koltsov and in 1918 he taught experimental biology at Shanyavsky University and from 1919 at the Moscow State University. In 1919 he went with his students to Askania Nova in southern Ukraine and began to conduct experiments on gonadal transplantations in chickens to alter the sex of fowl. When the war broke out, he and his students were stranded for nearly two years. He returned to Moscow in 1921 and then went to the Taurida University. He studied animal reproduction and sexual development and published two monographs. He experimentally showed that secondary sexual characters could be produced by manipulating hormones. He returned to Moscow University where he became a professor in 1924. In 1927 he was also in charge of the Moscow Zoo and was involved in studies to increase reproduction of farm animals using hormonal treatments. During World War II, he moved out to Alma Ata where he continued research. Zavadovsky's technique was used to stimulate pregnancies in farm animals and increase their production. A half million additional lambs were produced during the war years. In 1946 he received the Stalin Prize. In 1948 his department on developmental biology was closed and Zavadovsky was fired along with biologists like Nikolai Vavilov who were opposed to Trofim Lysenko. A developmental laboratory was started again after Stalin's death and Zavadovsky worked there in his last years. In 1955 he was one of the signatories to the "Letter of three hundred" which would help remove Lysenko from power. Mikhail's brother Boris, who also worked in endocrinology, clashed with A. L. Chizhevsky. Boris Zavadovsky took an interest in rejuvenation and aging.
