= Second International Congress of the History of Science =

Scientific conference in London (1931)

The Second International Congress of the History of Science was held in London from June 29 to July 4, 1931. The Congress was organised by the International Committee of History of Science, in conjunction with the Comité International des Sciences Historiques. The History of Science Society and the Newcomen Society also supported the event. Charles Singer presided over the congress. Although organised by the International Committee of History of Science, it was during this congress that this organisation was transformed into an individual membership organisation called the International Academy of the History of Science.

The inaugural session was held in the Great Hall of the Royal Geographical Society. This was opened by Hastings Lees-Smith, President of the Board of Education. The rest of the congress was conducted in four sessions held in the lecture hall of the Science Museum.

== Sessions ==
=== The Sciences as an integral Part of General Historical Study ===
This session was chaired by Gino Loria (University of Genoa). George Clark (University of Oxford) initiated the session pleading that science has a truer sense of history than any other sphere of human activity. William Cecil Dampier then presented a hierarchical approach to the history of science. which he said should proceed from primitive emotions through law, economics, to science. This was followed by Thomas Greenwood (London University) who stressed the importance of understanding the history of mathematics in order to better grasp the history of philosophy. Archibald Hill (London University) then argued for more attention to the history of science in children's books.

This led to a response from the Soviet delegation: Boris Zavadovsky argued that the history of science should be conceived as the history of the process of development of mankind, showing the laws to which this history conformed, as a social whole particularly in relationship to class structure. Ernst Kolman discussed a letter which Charles Darwin sent to Karl Marx which touched on the former's avoidance of the topic of religion. Modest Rubinstein added that science had progressed through economic and social of which the "great men" were merely the expression.

=== Special Session: Science at the Crossroads ===
On the first day it was announced that there would be a "Special Session" to be held on the morning of 4 July at which the Soviet delegates would have the opportunity to present their papers. For the next five days the Soviet Embassy hosted a team of delegates, translators and proofreaders who produced the papers as separate documents by the morning of the Special Section. They were published as Science at the Crossroads 10 days later, with numerous typographical errors providing testimony to the rushed nature of their production process.

- "Theory and Practice From The Standpoint of Dialectical Materialism" by Nikolai Bukharin, Member of the Academy of Sciences, Director of the Industrial Research Department of the Supreme Economic Council, President of the Commission of the Academy of Sciences for the History of Knowledge.
- "Physics and Technology", Abram Ioffe, Member of the Academy of Sciences, Director of the Physico-Technical Institute, Leningrad.
- "Relations of Science, Technology, and Economics Under Capitalism, and in the Soviet Union" by Modest Rubinstein, Professor at the Institute of Economics, Moscow; Member of the Presidium of the Communist Academy, Moscow; Member of the Presidium of the State Planning Commission (Gosplan).
- The "Physical" and "Biological" in the Process of Organic Evolution" by Boris Zavadovsky, Director of the Institute of Neuro-Humoral Physiology, K. A. Timiriaseff, Director of the Biological Museum.
- "Dynamic and Statistical Regularity in Physics and Biology" by Ernst Kolman, President of the Association of the Scientific Institute of Natural Science, Professor of the Institute of Mathematics and Mechanics, Moscow; Member of the Presidium of the State Scientific Council.
- "The Problem of the Origin of the World's Agriculture in the Light of the Latest Investigations" by Nikolai Vavilov, Member of the Academy of Sciences, President of the Lenin Agricultural Academy.
- "The Work of Faraday and Modern Developments in the Application of Electrical Energy" by Vladimir Mitkevich, Member of the Academy of Sciences.
- "Electrification as the basis of the Technological Reconstruction in the Soviet Union" by Modest Rubinstein.
- "The Social and Economic Roots of Newton’s Principia" by Boris Hessen, Director of the Moscow Institute of Physics, Member of the Presidium of the State Scientific Council. This highly influential work became foundational in the history of science and led to modern studies of Scientific Revolutions and sociology of science.
- "The Present Crisis in the Mathematical Sciences and General Outlines for Their Reconstruction" by Ernst Kolman.
- "Short Communication on the Unpublished Writings of Karl Marx Dealing With Mathematics, The Natural Sciences and Technology and the History of these Subjects" by Ernst Kolman.
