= Alexei Tsvetkov (sculptor) =

Russian sculptor

Alexei Sergeevich Tsvetkov
- Born: 17 March 1924; Bukarevo (Tver Province), Soviet Russia
- Died: 28 June 2009 (aged 85); Moscow, Russian Federation
- Education: Saint Petersburg Art and Industry Academy
- Known for: Sculpture, Painting
- Movement: Animal painter

Alexei Sergeevich Tsvetkov (Russian: Алексе́й Серге́евич Цветко́в; 17 March 1924, Bukarevo (Tver Province), Soviet Russia – 26 June 2009, Moscow, Russian Federation) was a Russian sculptor (animal painter), Honored Artist of Russian Federation, who lived and worked in Moscow. His sculptures reside in State Russian Museum, State Tretyakov Gallery, in art museums and private collections in Russia and other countries of the world.

== Biography ==
Alexei Sergeevich Tsvetkov was born on 17 March 1924 in the family of a peasant called Sergei Tsvetkov in the village of Bukarevo in Tver Province. He was wounded and lost a leg while serving in the Second World War. He studied at the Vera Mukhina School of Art and Industry in Leningrad (1945–50). In 1952, he moved to Moscow. Alexey Tsvetkov is called "the master of the wood", as he keeps this material live in his works. His sculptures reside in State Russian Museum, State Tretyakov Gallery, in art museums and private collections in Russia and other countries of the world. He has created more than 300 sculptures.
