= Ernst Kolman =

Marxist philosopher (1892-1979)

Ernst Kolman or Arnošt Yaromirovich Kolman (Russian: Арношт Яромирович Кольман); 6 December 1892 – 22 January 1979) was a Marxist propagandist, an ideological enforcer in Soviet science, and an informant during the Stalinist purges. At the age of 84 he sought asylum in Sweden and published a retraction of his previous activity.

== Biography ==
He was born in Prague to a Jewish family and studied at Charles University.

During World War I he fought in the Austro-Hungarian army and was taken prisoner by the Russian forces. After the Russian Revolution he joined the Bolshevik party and worked as a party functionary in the Red Army and the Communist International.

In 1923 Kolman was assigned to the party apparatus in Moscow, where he quickly assumed the role of ideological watchdog in scientific community. He became deputy head of the Moscow Party Science Department in 1936.

In 1930 Dmitri Egorov, the president of Moscow Mathematical Society was arrested by Soviet secret police. Under threat of the society's closure, Ernst Kolman was elected its new president, a position he held from 1930 to 1932.

Kolman attended the Second International Congress of the History of Science and Technology held in London in June–July 1931. He was part of a delegation of Soviet scientists led by Nikolai Bukharin.

He attacked a number of prominent Soviet mathematicians and physicists, accusing them of wrecking and different political crimes. Kolman initiated the so-called "Academician Luzin case". In July–August 1936, Nikolai Luzin was criticised in Pravda in a series of anonymous articles, whose authorship later was attributed to Kolman. Luzin was accused of publishing his works in foreign scientific journals and denounced for being close to the “slightly modernized ideology of the black hundreds, orthodoxy, and monarchy.”

After World War II Kolman was sent to Czechoslovakia, where he worked as a head of the propaganda department of the Communist Party of Czechoslovakia Central Committee. He helped to establish communist party control over the Czekhoslovak scientific community. At the 10th International Congress of Philosophy in Amsterdam Kolman attacked all non-Marxist philosophies as "fascist and imperialist."

In 1948 Kolman criticized Rudolf Slánský and Klement Gottwald. He was summoned back to USSR and spent three years at the Lubianka prison, until Stalin's death.

He returned to Czechoslovakia in 1958–1963, and then lived in Moscow, where he became increasingly disaffected with Soviet communism.

Kolman authored several books on dialectical materialism and historical materialism.

== Defection ==
In 1976 he applied for political asylum in Sweden, making him the oldest asylum seeker from the Soviet Union at the time at 84. He terminated his 58-year membership of the Communist Party of the Soviet Union on September 22, 1976, in an open letter addressed to party general secretary Leonid Brezhnev. On 9 December 1976, the Czechoslovak government revoked his membership of the Czechoslovak Academy of Sciences. He died on 22 January 1979 in Stockholm.

== Publications (incomplete list) ==
- Karl Marx and Mathematics (1968)
- "Hegel and Mathematics" (1931) published in Under the Banner of Marxism, 1931.
- The adventure of cybernetics in the Soviet Union, Minerva vol 16, no 3 (September 1978), 416–424.
- Die verirrte Generation (with Hanswilhelm Haefs and Frantisek Janouch). Fischer Taschenbuch-Verlag, 1979, extended 1982, ISBN 978-3-596-23464-6. (In German. Translations into Swedish, Danish, and Czech (ISBN 978-8-090-45733-1) exist).

== Bibliography ==
Pavel Kovaly, "Arnoŝt Kolman: Portrait of a Marxist-Leninist philosopher," Studies in East European Thought 12 (1972): 337–366.
