= Schmalhausen =

Schmalhausen may refer to:

- Ivan Ivanovich Schmalhausen, a Russian and Ukrainian zoologist and evolutionist
- Johannes Theodor Schmalhausen, a botanist known for his study of East European plants
