= Doszhan Tileuliuly =

Doszhan Tıleuliuly (Kazakh: Досжан Тілеуліұлы; recorded in Russian sources as Dashchan Tleulin) was a legendary Kazakh barymta raider, brave warrior, and horseman of the 19th century, renowned for his daring raids in the steppes along the Syr Darya River and for his escape from a Siberian penal labor camp. While official documents and historical records of the Russian Empire portrayed him as a “bandit,” traditional steppe society regarded him as one of its most respected batyrs (heroes).

He gained wider historical recognition through the accidental capture of the famous Russian biologist, explorer, and traveler Nikolai Severtsov, an event that brought his name to broader public attention.

== Raider ==
Although Doszhan possessed no inherited wealth in his youth, he distinguished himself through exceptional courage. He engaged in barymta—the driving away of livestock. In the traditional Kazakh nomadic legal system, barymta was originally not regarded as ordinary criminal robbery; rather, it served as a form of economic retaliation and customary justice used to recover debts or obtain compensation for damages between clans. Before long, Doszhan became one of the most influential figures involved in barymta activities in the Syr Darya region.

== Escape from Siberia on an officer’s horse ==
His raids severely troubled the pro-Russian Kazakhs of the Syr Darya region. Eventually, they set a trap for him, captured him, and handed him over to the imperial authorities. Doszhan was tried and sentenced to penal servitude in Siberia. However, while being transported to exile (or, according to some accounts, after arriving at the penal colony), he carried out a remarkable escape. During the night, he broke his shackles, secretly saddled the commander's finest horse, and fled toward his native steppe. He later found refuge in territories near the border of the Kokand Khanate.

== Capture of Nikolai Severtsov (1858) ==
At the end of 1857, Dashchan entered the service of the Kokand authorities and was stationed at the fortress of Yany-Kurgan. In April 1858, while leading a small detachment, he encountered a group of Russian soldiers accompanied by the naturalist and explorer Nikolai Severtsov, who was conducting zoological research and gathering fuel.

During a brief skirmish, Severtsov was seriously wounded, including saber blows to the head, and was taken prisoner by Dashchan. The relationship that developed between the “raider” and the scientist proved unexpected. Demonstrating the generosity valued in steppe culture, Dashchan personally dressed Severtsov's wounds, shared his food with him, and later promised that he would be ransomed and released.

In his memoir A Month in Kokand Captivity, Severtsov later portrayed Dashchan in a romantic light, describing him as an “honorable brigand” and a “brave man carrying on the glory of the ancient heroes.”

== Conflict between two generals ==
Dashchan's capture of Severtsov triggered a major diplomatic and military dispute within the Russian Empire itself. Generals Alexander Katenin and Nikolai Dandeville became embroiled in a serious disagreement over how Severtsov should be rescued and what measures should be taken against the Kokand forces and Dashchan.

Severtsov was eventually released, while the story of Dashchan became permanently embedded in the geographical and historical chronicles of Turkestan.

== Death ==
The death of Batyr Doszhan (Dashchan) was directly connected to his recapture by the imperial authorities and the severe punishment imposed upon him. After the release of Nikolai Severtsov, Russian forces in the Syr Darya region intensified pressure on local communities in an effort to apprehend the famous raider. Exhausted by continued reprisals and punitive expeditions, local Kazakhs eventually captured Doszhan themselves and delivered him to the Fort Perovsky garrison.

A military court sentenced him to exile in Siberia and ordered that, before transportation, he receive 2,000 strokes of the spitzruten (a severe form of corporal punishment involving beating with rods). This brutal punishment caused irreparable damage to his health.

Ironically, Colonel Mikhail Chernyaev, who would later become famous for the capture of Tashkent, intervened on Doszhan's behalf. Knowing that Severtsov had spoken warmly of Doszhan in his memoirs, Chernyaev considered the sentence excessively harsh and entered into open conflict with General Dandeville. By Chernyaev's order, the severely injured Doszhan was transferred from solitary confinement to a military hospital, and his shackles were removed. Despite the medical care he received, his body could not withstand the effects of the severe beatings and the prison fever he contracted. Doszhan Batyr died in the hospital from his injuries before he could be transported to Siberian penal servitude. His death brought an end to one of the most significant military-judicial controversies in the Syr Darya region during the late 1850s.
