= Alexei Severtsov =

Russian zoologist (1866–1936)

Alexei Nikolaevich Severtsov Алексей Николаевич Северцов
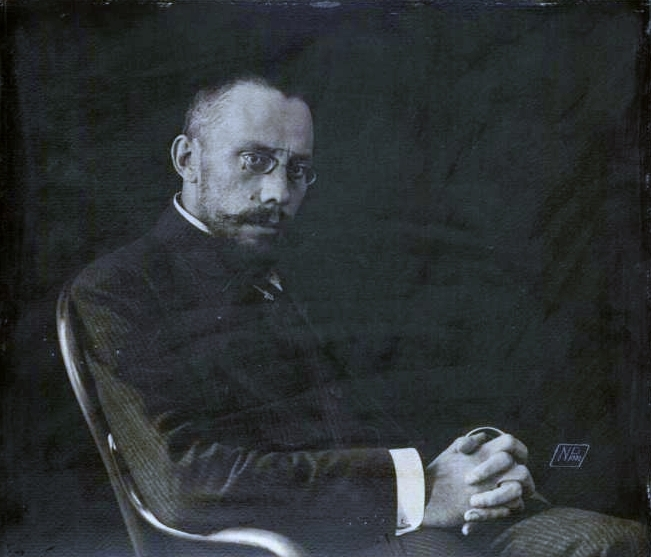
- Alexei Severtsov in 1907
- Born: 11 September 1866; Moscow
- Died: 16 December 1936 (aged 70); Moscow
- Education: Lomonosov University
- Children: Sergei Alekseevich Severtsov
- Father: Nikolai Severtzov
- Awards: Karl Baer Prize
- Scientific career
- Fields: Evolutionary biology
- Workplaces: Marine biology laboratories in Villefranche-sur-Mer, Naples and Germany; University of Dorpat
- Notable students: Ivan Schmalhausen

Alexei Nikolaevich Severtsov (Russian: Алексей Николаевич Северцов; 11 September 1866 – 16 December 1936) was a Russian and Soviet evolutionary zoologist who worked on comparative anatomy and morphology. He was the son of the zoologist Nikolai Severtzov. He studied the evolution of vertebrates and established an institute for evolutionary morphology which is now named after him as the AN Severtsov Institute of Ecology and Evolution. He introduced various concepts of phyloembryology and evolutionary physiology.

== Biography ==
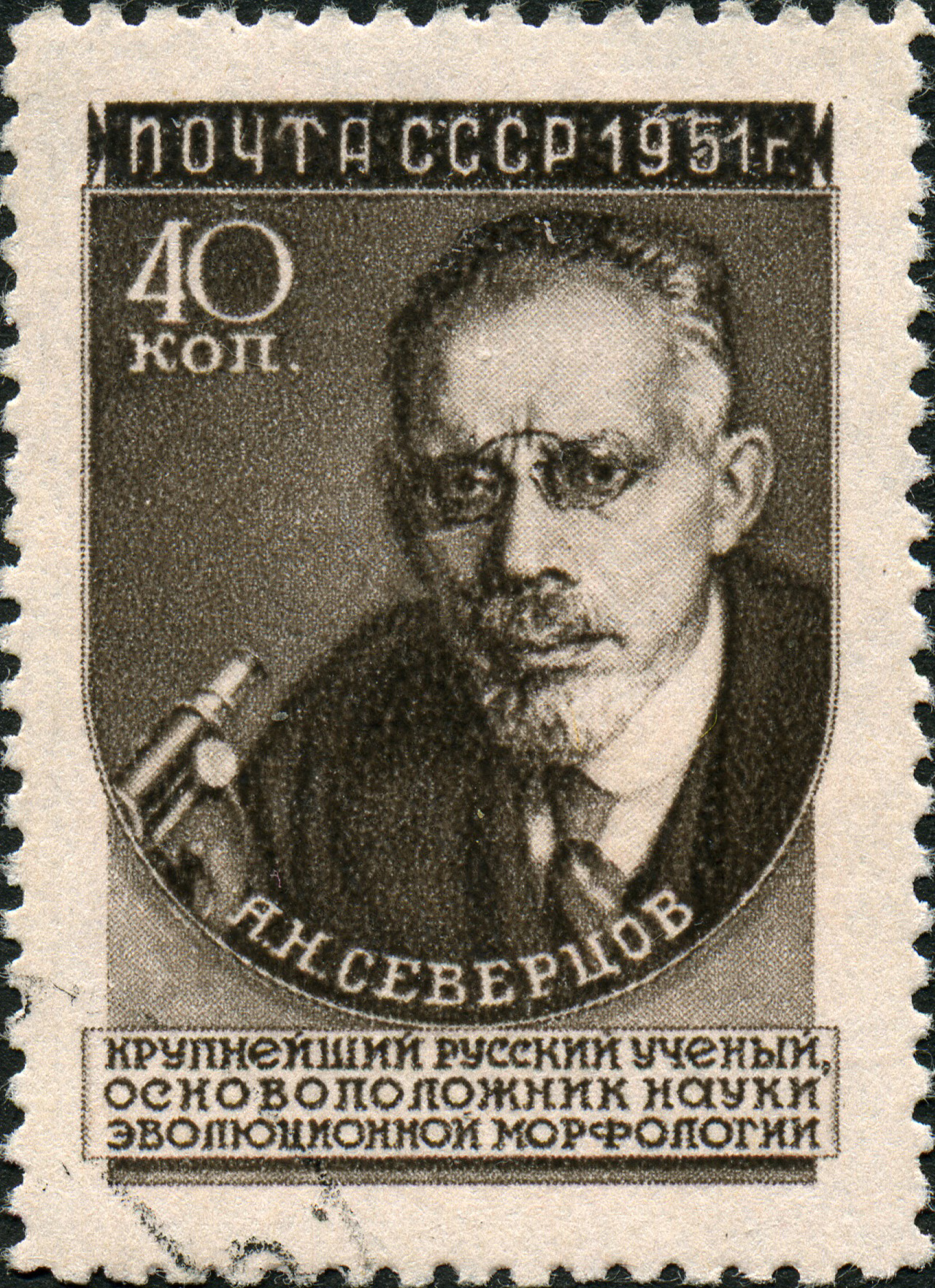
1951 Soviet stamp commemorating Severtsov

Severtsov was born in Moscow where his father was the zoologist, Nikolai Severtzov. After private schooling in Petrov, Bobrovsky Uyezd in the Voronezh Governorate, he went to the Lomonosov University in 1885 and graduated in 1895. Influential teachers included P. P. Sushkin, M. A. Menzbir, I. M. Sechenov, K. A. Timiryazev, and V. V. Markovnikov. Menzbir advised that he learns drawing and he then took lessons from the famous artist N. A. Martynov. Severtsov used his artistic skill not only to make scientific illustrations but for artistic works as well including illustrations for scenes from Goethe's Faust and for his own fairy tales. He then worked at marine biology laboratories in Villefranche-sur-Mer, Naples, and Germany. He received a doctorate in 1898 for research on the metameres of the head of the torpedo ray and went to teach zoology from at the University of Dorpat (Tartu) and from 1902 at Kiev and then from 1911 at Moscow. His master's thesis was on the development of the occipital region of lower vertebrates. For his work on the evolution of the lower vertebrates he received the Karl Baer Prize of 1919. He studied the origin of the maxillary apparatus and the breathing organs of fish. He suggested that the five fingered tetrapod limb evolved from 7-10-ray limb of ancestors that included multi-ray fins of fish-like forms. In 1930 he established a laboratory for evolutionary anatomy and morphology. Severtsov followed on the theme of organ function change begun by St. George Mivart and Anton Dohrn.

One of his students was Ivan Schmalhausen. Severtsov developed the biogenetic law or recapitulation theory of Ernst Haeckel under the term that he coined, phyloembryologenesis, and attempted to explain evolution through morphological and developmental changes. He explained this in a book in German Morphologische Gesetzmäßigkeiten der Evolution published in 1931. His son Sergei Alekseevich Severtsov (1891-1947) became an ecologist.
