= Oleksandr Markevych =

Soviet and Ukrainian zoologist

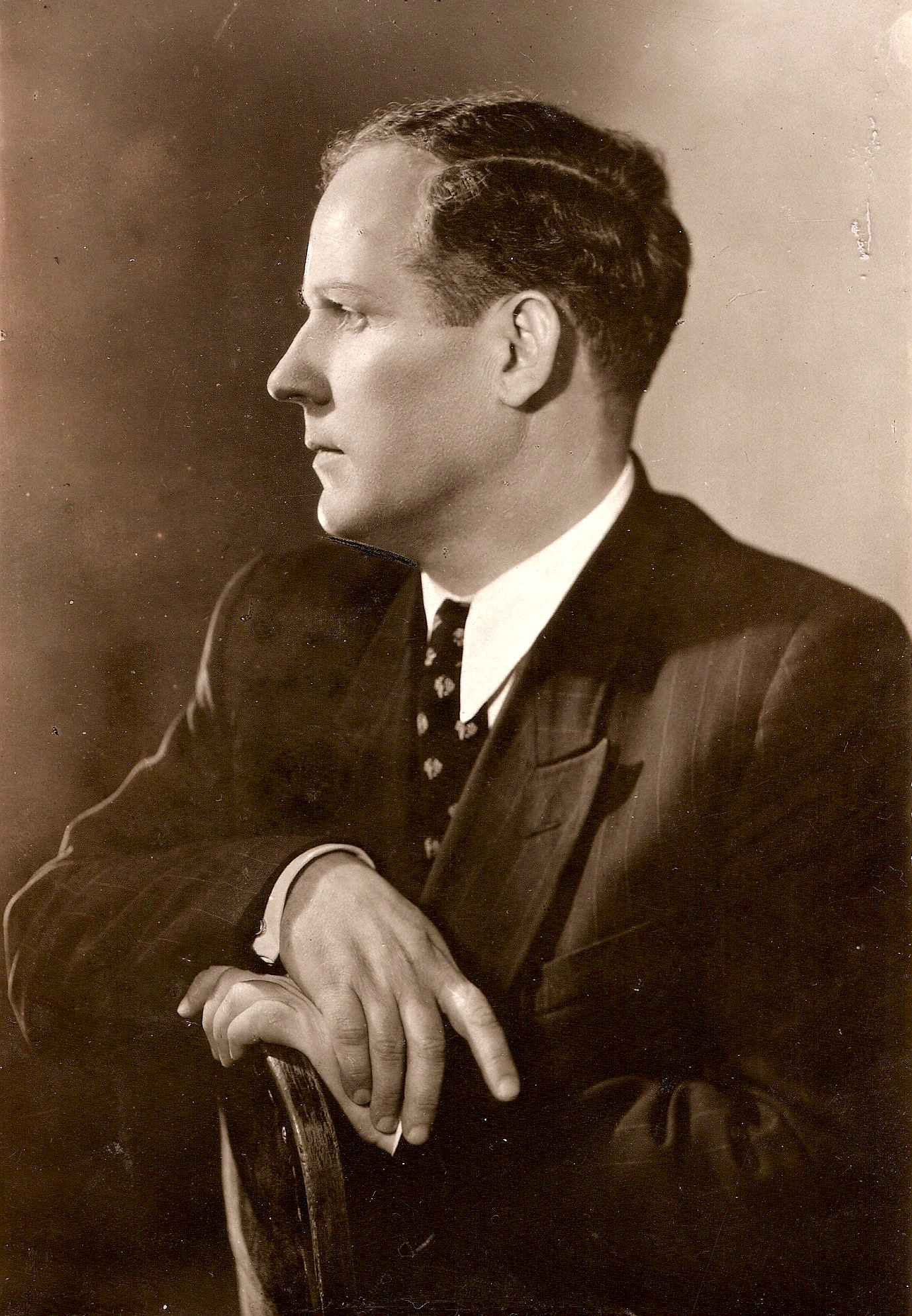
- Born: Oleksandr Prokopovych Markevych; March 19, 1905; Ploske, Kiev Governorate, Russian Empire
- Died: April 23, 1999 (aged 94); Kyiv, Ukraine
- Education: Kyiv University
- Scientific career
- Fields: Zoology, parasitology, carcinology, helminthology
- Workplaces: Kyiv University, I. I. Schmalhausen Institute of Zoology
- Doctoral advisor: Valentin Dogiel
- Other academic advisors: Ivan Schmalhausen
- Doctoral students: Vladyslav Monchenko
- Author abbrev. (zoology): Markevich

Signature
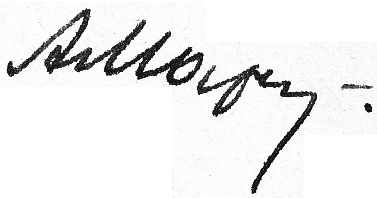

Oleksandr Prokopovych Markevych (Ukrainian: Олександр Прокопович Маркевич; 19 March 1905, Ploske – 23 April 1999, Kyiv) was a Soviet and Ukrainian zoologist, and a prolific helminthologist and copepodologist. He was professor and an Academician of the National Academy of Sciences of Ukraine.

== Biography ==
Markevych was born 19 March 1905 in the village of Ploske, Kiev Governorate. His father Prokop Markevych served as a parish clerk in a rural church. His mother Maria Bordashevska came from a family of the impoverished nobility. During his studies at the Pedagogical Technical School (1921–1925) in Bila Tserkva, he was engaged in research on ichthyology. He continued his studies at Kyiv University, where he worked in the laboratory of Ivan Schmalhausen and simultaneously at the biological station of the Academy of Sciences of the Ukrainian SSR, situated on the Dnieper River.

His keen interest in fish parasites led him to work at the Ichthyological Institute of the Lenin All-Union Academy of Agricultural Sciences in Leningrad (now the Research Institute of the Lake and River Fish Industry), where he completed his post-graduate studies under the guidance of professor Valentin Dogiel. In the 1930s a team of scientists at the Laboratory of Fish Diseases, headed by Dogiel, laid the foundations of Soviet ichthyoparasitology. At this laboratory the young Markevych began to study the then little known and very complicated group Copepoda parasitica, with extraordinary diligence and perseverance. He studied the fauna of this group living in lakes Ladoga and Onega, in the Caspian and Azov seas and in a number of smaller water bodies.

In 1935 he returned to Kyiv, where at first he headed the Invertebrate Morphology Department of the Zoological Institute, in the Academy of Sciences of the Ukrainian SSR, then in 1937 became head of the newly established Parasitological Department of that Institute.

== Scientific career and publications ==
Markevych was one of the first Soviet parasitologists to begin a systematic study of fishpond culture. He was the first to publish that the dangerous fish parasite Chilodonella cyprini reproduces massively in the winter and not in the summer, as supposed earlier. His key papers described the new species of parasitic copepods:

- Ergasilus briani Markevych, 1932
- Paraergasilus rylovi Markevych, 1937
- Ergasilus auritus Markevych, 1940
- Ergasilus anchoratus Markevych, 1946

After returning to Kyiv in 1935 Markevych continued his ichthyoparasitological investigations. In 1951 he published an extensive monograph on the parasite fauna of freshwater fishes of the Ukrainian SSR. This monograph received a strong response in the USSR and abroad. In 1963 it was published in English under the title "Parasitic Fauna of Freshwater Fish of the Ukrainian SSR". He continued to be actively interested in the research of Copepoda parasitica, and his latest monograph on the parasitic Copepoda of fish in the USSR was published for the Smithsonian Institution and the National Science Foundation (USA) by the Indian National Scientific Documentation Centre (1976).

Proceeding from a series of solid scientific works on fish parasites (ichtyoparasitology) he formulated some theoretical fundamentals after complex studies on parasites of aquatic animals (hydroparasitology). As part of a scientific program, he identified studies needed on the ecology and development of the parasites of aquatic animals, studies on their influence on their host and vice versa, and studies on their dependence on abiotic and biotic factors.

The theory of parasitocenosis, formulated by E. N. Pavlovsky, found a follower in A. P. Markevych. Attracted by Pavlovsky's concept of parasitocenosis, Markevych analyzed new facts obtained by parasitologists and microbiologists since Pavlovsky's publications, wrote several papers on this issue, and defined the task of parasitocenology as the "elucidation of objective patterns of life of parasitosymbiocenoses as well as biocenotic groupings of free-living parasite stages, in order to elaborate methods for directing the formation processes of parasitic communities".

Markevych created a school of parasitologists in Ukraine and sparked the interest of a number of zoologists and botanists in the research of Carpathian fauna and flora. For several years he was Vice-president and later President of the Biological Sciences Department of the Academy of Sciences of the Ukrainian SSR. He also made outstanding contributions to the research of parasite fauna of fish in Egypt, where he worked as expert and professor at Cairo University (periodically 1964 to 1967).

== International activities and honors ==
- In 1958 member of the delegation of the USSR to the Fifteenth International zoological congress in London (Great Britain).
- In 1959 visited Bulgaria, lecturing on practical questions of the phylogeny of invertebrate animals in the University of Sofia.
- In 1964-1965 professor of the Zoology Department of the Faculty of Science at Cairo University.
- In 1966-1967 expert on questions of parasitology in the National Scientific Center of the Arabic Republic of Egypt (ARE).
- In 1967 appointed an honoured member of the Polish Society of Parasitologists.
- In 1969 selected member of Academy of Zoology of India.
- In 1969 appointed member of the International Commission of Protozoology.
- In 1970 he led a delegation of Soviet scientists to the Second International Congress of Parasitologists in Washington (USA).
- Editorial board member of the journals Angewandte Parasitologie (East Germany (GDR)) and Folia parasitologica (Czechoslovak Socialist Republic).

== Bibliography ==
- Markevych, A. P., 1931, "Parasitische Copepoden und Branchiuren des Aralsees, nebst systematische Bemerkungen über die Gattung Ergasilus Nordmann", Zoologischer Anzeiger Vol. 96(5-6): pp. 121-143, figs. 1-8. (1-x-1931);
- Markevych, A.P., 1933, "Tracheliastes soldatovi nov. sp., a new copepod parasitic on sturgeons of the Amur River", Bulletin of the Fan Memorial Institute of Biology, Zoology, Vol, 4(5), pp. 241-258, figs. 1-7, pl. 1. (English and Chinese);
- Markevych, A. P., 1934, Les maladies parasitaires des poissons de la Province de Leningrad, All-Union Cooperative United Publishing House, Leningrad and Moscow Vol. ?, pp. 3-100;
- Markewitsch, A. P., 1934, "Die Schmarotzerkrebse der Fische der Ukraine", Annales Musei Zoologici Polonici, 10, 223-249;
- Markevych, A. P., 1934, "Descrizione di due specie nuove di Ergasilus provenienti della Russia (U.R.S.S.). Copepodi parassiti", Memorie della Società Entomologica Italiana Vol. 12:129-141, figs. 1-18;
- Markevych, A. P., 1936, "Il genere Basanistes Nordmann, 1832 (Copepodi parassiti)", Atti della Società Italiana della Scienze Naturali, Vol. 75,227-242, figs. 1-8;
- Markevych, A. P., 1937, Copepoda Parasitica of Freshwaters of USSR (Kiev: Akademii Nauk. Ukrainskoj SSR), 223 pp.
- Маркевич О. П. - "Copepoda parasitica прісних вод СРСР", К., Вид-во АН УРСР, 1937, 222 с.; (Ukrainian)
- Маркевич А. П. - "Гельминтофауна рыб Днепра в районе Канева", Наукові записки Київського Гос.університета, 1949, Т. VIII, с. 8-12; (Russian)
- Маркевич О. П. - "Основи паразитологiї", К., 1950; (Ukrainian)
- Маркевич А. П. - "Паразитофауна пресноводных рыб УССР", К.: АН УССР, 1951; (Russian)
- Markevych, A. P. 1951. Parasitic fauna of freshwater fish of the Ukrainian S.S.R. Akademiya Nauk Ukrainskoi SSR, Institut Zoologii, Kiev, 375 pp. Translated from Russian by N. Rafael, Israel Program for Scientific Translations. Office of Technical Series, U.S. Department of Commerce, Washington, D.C. 388 pp.;
- Маркевич О. П., Короткий И. I. - "Визначник прісноводних риб УРСР", К., 1954; (Ukrainian)
- Маркевич А. П. - "Паразитические веслоногие рыб СССР", К., 1956; (Russian)
- Маркевич А. П. - "Развитие животного мира", ч. 1, К., 1957; (Russian)
- Markevych, A. P., 1959, "Parasitic copepods of fishes in the U.S.S.R. and the peculiarities of their distribution", In: Proceedings of the XV. International Congress of Zoology (London), Vol. ?, pp. 669-671;
- Markevych, A. P., 1963, Parasitic fauna of freshwater fish of the Ukrainian SSR. Israel Program Scient. Trans. Jerusalem Volume: :1-388, figs. 1-257. (Translation of: Markevych, A. P., 1956);
- Маркевич О. П. - "Фiлогенiя тваринного свiту". К., 1964; (Ukrainian)
- Markevych, A. P., 1976, Parasitic copepodes on the fishes of the USSR, Indian National Scientific Documentation Centre, New Delhi; for the Smithsonian Institution and the National Science Foundation, Washington, DC (English translation) Vol.?, 445 pp.;
- Маркевич А. П., Татарко К. И. - "Русско-украинско-латинский зоологический словарь. Терминология и номенклатура", К., "Наукова думка", 1983; (Russian)

== Species named in Markevych's honour ==
Markevych's authority among colleagues, students and followers, is evident from the many organisms named in his honour:

- Asymphylodora markewitschi Kulakowskaja, 1947;
- Allocreadium markewitschi Kowal, 1949;
- Trypanosoma markewitschi Lubinsky et Salewskaja, 1950;
- Gyrodactylus markewitschi Kulakowskaja, 1952
- Diorchis markewitschi Patschenko, 1952
- Cryptobia markewitschi Schapoval, 1953
- Myxobolus markewitschi Palij, 1953
- Phyllodistomum markewitschi Pigulevsky, 1953
- Helicometra markewitschi Pogorelzeva, 1954
- Dactylogyrus markewitschi Gussev, 1955
- Entamoeba markewitschi Chebotarev, 1956
- Markewitschiellinae Skrjabin et Koval, 1957
- Markevitschiella Skrjabin et Koval, 1957
- Laelaspis markewitschi Pirianyk, 1958
- Stephanoproraoides markewitschi Sharpilo L. et V., 1959
- Pseudoxiphydria markewitschi Jermolenko, 1960
- Charopinus markewitschi Gussev, 1961
- Sphaerospora markewitschi Donec, 1962
- Markewitschia Yamaguti, 1963
- Diplozoon markewitschi Bychowsky, Gintovt et Koval, 1964
- Pseudoanthocotyle markewitschi Nikolaeva et Pogorelzeva, 1965
- Markewitschia Kulakowskaja et Achmerov, 1965
- Chloromyxum markewitschi Butabayeva et Allamuratov, 1965
- Henneguya markewitschi Allamuratov, 1965
- Lepronyssoides markewitschi Vshivkov, 1965
- Vitta alexandri Kornyushin, 1966
- Lamproglena markewitschi Sukhenko et Allamuratov, 1966
- Markewitschiana Allamuratov et Koval, 1967
- Markewitschella Spassky et Spasskaja, 1972
- Markewitschitaenia Sharpilo et Kornjuschin, 1975
- Aeolosoma markewitschi Boshko et Pashkevichute, 1975
- Heteronychia markewitschi Verves, 1975
- Markevitschielinus Tytar, 1975
- Paraergasilus markevichi Titar et Chernogorenko, 1982

For helminths, he is honored by:

- Lopastoma markevichi Kurochkin et Korotaeva, in Polyanskij, 1982

And for myxozoans:

- Ceratomyxa markewitchi Iskov et Karataev, 1984
- Clariidae Kutikova, Markevych et Spiridonov, 1990 (Rotifera)

== Biographic bibliography ==
- Мазурмович Б. М., Шульга І. К. - "Видатні вітчизняні зоологи" - К., "Радянська школа", 1953 - стор, pp. 193–194
- "Про організацію Українського республіканського товариства паразитологів", Вісник АН УРСР, № 7, 1956 pp. 77–78
- Чеботарьов Р. С., Коваль В. П. - "Олександр Прокопович Маркевич", Труди Інституту зоології АН УРСР, т. 13, 1956 pp. 101–109
- "Akademik A. P. Markevič" - "Mladý svět", 1959, № 49
- Мазурмович Б. Н., Бошко Г. В. - "Научная, педагогическая и общественная деятельность академика АН УССР А. П. Маркевича", Паразиты человека и животных. – 1965. pp. 5–19
- "Akademik A. P. Markevič oslavil šedesátiny", "Veterinářstvi", 1965
- Dyk V., Kratochvil J. - "Šedesátiny akademika A. P. Markeviče", "Zoologické listy", 1965, № 4, p. 384
- Eichler W. - "Aleksandr Procof'evič Markevič 60 Jahre alt", "Angew. Parasitologie", 1965, № 1, pp. 1–2
- Мазурмович Б. М. - "Розвиток зоології в Київському університеті за 50 років радянської влади", Вісник Київського університету, № 9, 1967 рp. 17-23
- "Akademik A. P. Markevič", "Bulletin VŠZ", 1967, № 5
- Dyk V. - "Zlatá medaile VŠZ akademiku A. P. Markevičovi" ("Golden Medal VŠZ to Academician A. P. Markevičovi",), "Acta Universit. agricult., Facult. veterinaria", 1968, № 2, pp. 370–371
- Корнеев С. Г. - "Советские ученые - почетные члены иностранных научных учреждений" - М., "Наука", 1973, p. 66
- Писаренко Г.С. - "О. П. Маркевич", АН УРСР. Бібліографія вчених Української РСР - К., "Наукова думка" – 1975. р. 67
- Бошко Г. В., Засухин Д. Н. - "К 70-летию академика АН УССР А. П. Маркевича", Медицинская паразитология и паразитарные болезни. – 1975 pp. 113–115
- "К 75-летию академика АН УССР Александра Прокофьевича Маркевича", Паразитология, 1980, XIV, No. 6
- Романенко В. Д. - "Александр Прокофьевич Маркевич (К 80-летию со дня рождения)", Гидробиологический журнал, К., 1985 (отдельный оттиск), pp. 109–110
- "Академік Олександр Прокопович Маркевич. Життя і діяльність", НАНУ Інститут зоології ім. І. І. Шмальгаузена УНТП. Київ, "Наукова думка", 1999 р. 190
- Монченко В. И. - "Вклад академика А. П. Маркевича в зоологическую науку", Вестник зоологии, Отдельный выпуск, 19, часть 1, 2005 pp. 11–14
- Kornyushin V. V. - "Scientific and Practical Conference of the Ukrainian Scientific Society of Parazitologists Dedicated to Centenary of Academician of NAS of Ukraine A. P. Markevych", Vestnik Zoologii, Vol. 39, No. 6 (November–December 2005), pp. 87–88

== Resources of the Internet ==
Media related to Aleksandr Prokofyevich Markevich at Wikimedia Commons

- Александр Прокофьевич Маркевич 1905—1999 Українське наукове товариство паразитологів.
- Маркевич, Александр Прокофьевич Большая биографическая энциклопедия.
- Маркевич Александр Прокофьевич БСЭ
- НАН України Інститут зоології ім. Шмальгаузена
- Глоба Ольга Федорівна - УЧЕНІ-ПРИРОДОЗНАВЦІ КИЇВЩИНИ
- Ольга Кратко - Становлення наукового світогляду професора МАРКЕВИЧА О. П.
- Ольга Кратко - Маркевич Олександр Прокопович (1905-1999 рр.) – організатор українського республіканського товариства паразитологів
- Науково-практична конференція укр. наукового товариства паразитологів, присвячена 100-річчю з дня народження акад. НАН УКРАЇНИ О. П. МАРКЕВИЧА
- George Hanek and William Threlfall, "Ergasilus auritus Markewitsch, 1940 (Copepoda: Ergasilidae) from Gasterosteus aculeatus Linnaeus, 1758 in Newfoundland" // Canadian Journal of Zoology, Vol. 48, No. 1, January 1970, pp. 185-187
- Hoda El-Rashidy; Geoffrey A. Boxshall Biogeography and phylogeny of Paraergasilus Markevych, 1937
- Stephen Alston, Geoffrey A. Boxshall and John W. Lewis, "A redescription of adult females of Ergasilus briani Markewitsch, 1933 (Copepoda: Poecilostomatoida)" // Systematic Parasitology, 1993, Vol. 24, No. 3, pp. 217-227
- Alston S, Boxshall GA & Lewis JW (1996) " The life cycle of Ergasilus briani Markewitsch, 1933 (Copepoda: Poecilostomatoida)" // Systematic Parasitology 35: 79-110
- Turkiye Parazitoloji Dergisi 2007, Cilt 31, Sayı 2, Sayfa(lar) 158-161
- The World of Copepods - Smithsonian National Museum of Natural History
