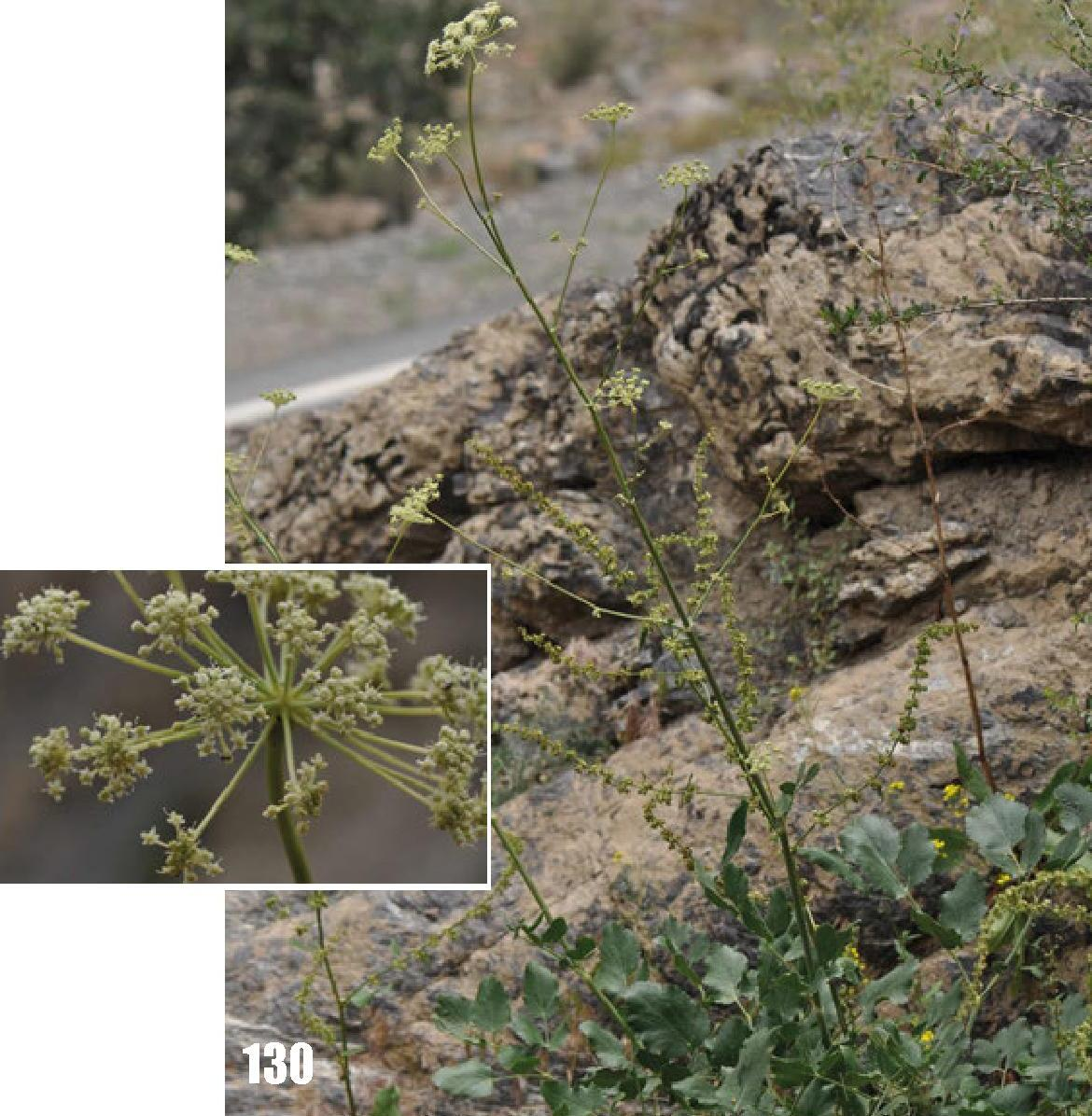

Scientific classification
- Kingdom: Plantae
- Clade: Embryophytes
- Clade: Tracheophytes
- Clade: Spermatophytes
- Clade: Angiosperms
- Clade: Eudicots
- Clade: Asterids
- Order: Apiales
- Family: Apiaceae
- Tribe: Echinophoreae
- Genus: Mediasia; Pimenov
- Species: M. macrophylla

Binomial name
- Mediasia macrophylla (Regel & Schmalh.) Pimenov

= Mediasia =

Genus of plants

Mediasia is a monotypic genus of flowering plants belonging to the family Apiaceae with the sole accepted species Mediasia macrophylla.

Its native range is Central Asia to Afghanistan.

== Species ==
Species:

- Mediasia macrophylla (Regel & Schmalh.) Pimenov
