= Anti-cosmopolitan campaign =

Anti-Western campaigns under Joseph Stalin, 1948–1953

The anti-cosmopolitan campaign (Russian: Борьба с космополитизмом, lit. 'The fight against cosmopolitanism', Bor'ba s kosmopolitizmom) was an anti-Western campaign in the Soviet Union which began in late 1946.

The campaign was a part of the Soviet government's implementation of the Zhdanov doctrine, particularly against cosmopolitan ideas in artistic and intellectual media. Part of Zhdanovism was a campaign against cosmopolitanism, which meant that foreign models were not to be unthinkingly emulated, and Soviet accomplishments were emphasized. Increased government censorship resulted in the persecution of creatives (including poets, writers, composers, theater critics) and the intelligentsia. Famous 'cosmopolitans' included poet Anna Akhmatova, satirist Mikhail Zoshchenko, composer Dimitri Shostakovich.

It has been widely described as a thinly disguised antisemitic purge. A large number of Jews were persecuted as Zionists or rootless cosmopolitans.

== Origins ==
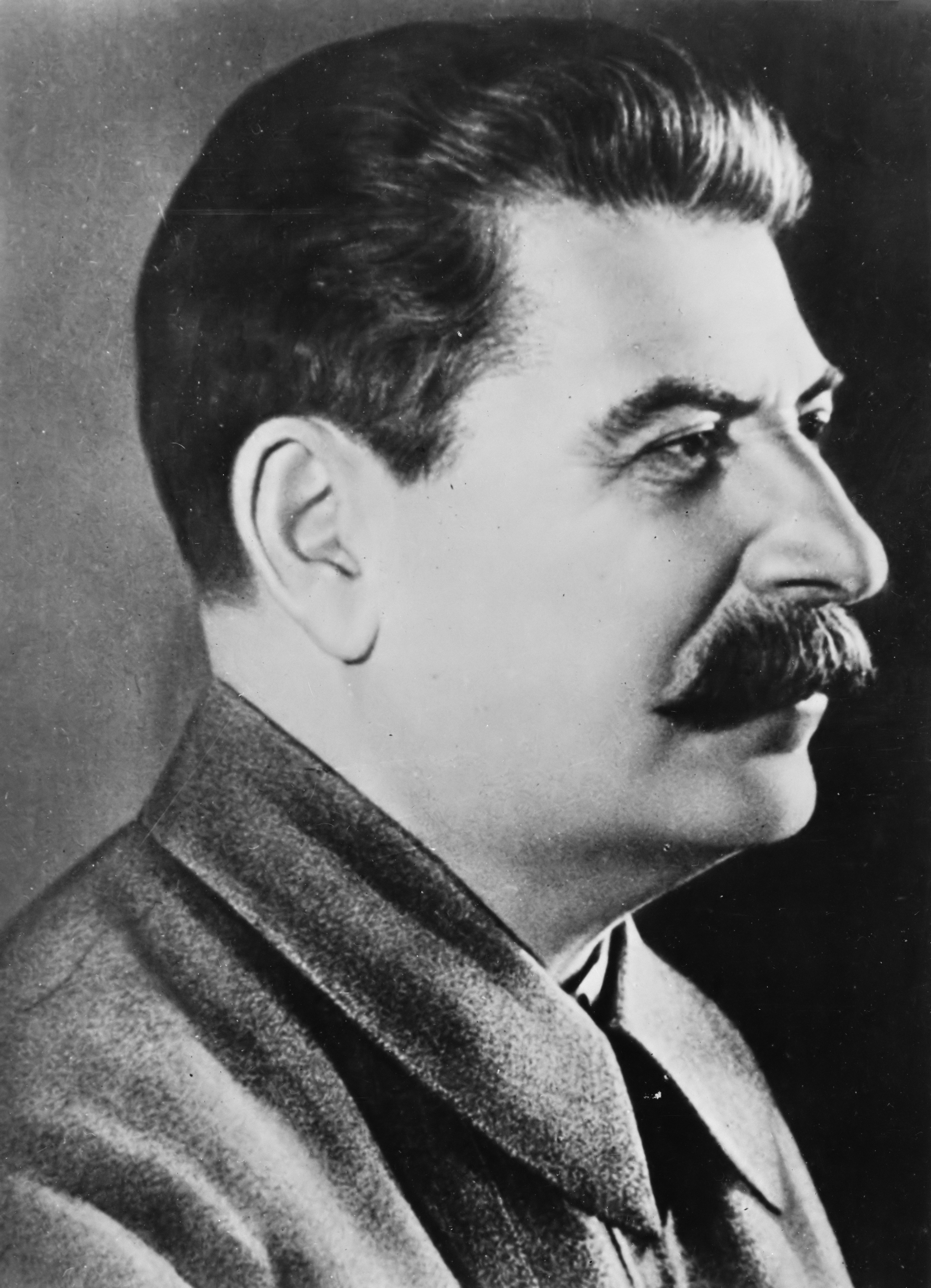
Joseph Stalin

During a meeting with Soviet intelligentsia in 1946, Stalin voiced his concerns about recent developments in Soviet culture, which later would materialize in the "battle against cosmopolitanism" (see Zhdanov Doctrine).

Recently, a dangerous tendency seems to be seen in some of the literary works emanating under the pernicious influence of the West and brought about by the subversive activities of the foreign intelligence. Frequently in the pages of Soviet literary journals works are found where Soviet people, builders of communism are shown in pathetic and ludicrous forms. The positive Soviet hero is derided and inferior before all things foreign and cosmopolitanism that we all fought against from the time of Lenin, characteristic of the political leftovers, is many times applauded. In the theater it seems that Soviet plays are pushed aside by plays from foreign bourgeois authors. The same thing is starting to happen in Soviet films.

== Persecution of Soviet creatives and intelligentsia ==
In 1946, a resolution of the Central Committee titled "On the magazines 'Zvezda' and 'Leningrad'" was directed against two literary magazines, Zvezda and Leningrad, which had published supposedly apolitical, "bourgeois", individualistic works of the satirist Mikhail Zoshchenko and the poet Anna Akhmatova. Earlier, some critics and literary historians were denounced for suggesting that Russian classics had been influenced by Jean-Jacques Rousseau, Molière, Lord Byron or Charles Dickens.

In 1946 and 1947, the new campaign against cosmopolitanism affected Soviet scientists, such as the physicist Pyotr Kapitsa and the president of the Academy of Sciences of the Byelorussian SSR, Anton Romanovich Zhebrak, neither of whom were Jewish. They along with other scientists were denounced for contacts with their Western colleagues and support for "bourgeois science".

In 1947, many literary critics were accused of "kneeling before the West" ("низкопоклонство перед западом", also "идолопоклонство перед западом", "idolatry of the West", "idolization of the West"), as well as anti-patriotism and cosmopolitanism. For example, the campaign targeted those who studied the works of Alexander Veselovsky, the founder of Russian comparative literature, which was described as a "bourgeois cosmopolitan direction in literary criticism".

A new stage of the campaign opened on January 28, 1949, when an article entitled "About one anti-patriotic group of theatre critics" appeared in the newspaper Pravda, an official organ of the Central Committee of the Communist Party:

An anti-patriotic group has developed in theatrical criticism. It consists of followers of bourgeois aestheticism. They penetrate our press and operate most freely in the pages of the magazine, Teatr, and the newspaper, Sovetskoe iskusstvo. These critics have lost their sense of responsibility to the people. They represent a rootless cosmopolitanism which is deeply repulsive and inimical to Soviet man. They obstruct the development of Soviet literature; the feeling of national Soviet pride is alien to them.

== Background history on Jews and the Soviet Union ==
After World War II, the Jewish Anti-Fascist Committee (JAC) grew increasingly influential to the post-Holocaust Soviet Jewry, and was accepted as its representative in the West. As its activities sometimes contradicted official Soviet policies (see The Black Book of Soviet Jewry as an example), it became a nuisance to Soviet authorities. The Central Auditing Commission of the Communist Party of the Soviet Union concluded that the JAC continued the line of the Bund.

In January 1948, the JAC's head, the popular actor and world-famous public figure Solomon Mikhoels, died; his death was officially a car accident but some historians allege it to be a targeted assassination.

The USSR voted for the 1947 United Nations Partition Plan for Palestine and in May 1948, it recognized the establishment of the state of Israel there, subsequently supporting it with weapons (via Czechoslovakia, in defiance of the embargo) in the 1948 Arab–Israeli war. Many Soviet Jews felt inspired and sympathetic towards Israel and sent thousands of letters to the (still formally existing) JAC with offers to contribute to or even volunteer for Israel's defence.

In September 1948, the first Israeli ambassador to the USSR, Golda Meir, arrived in Moscow. Huge enthusiastic crowds (estimated 50,000) gathered along her path and in and around Moscow synagogue when she attended it for Yom Kippur and Rosh Hashanah. These events corresponded in time with a visible upsurge of Russian nationalism orchestrated by official propaganda, the increasingly hostile Cold War and the realization by the Soviet leadership that Israel had chosen the Western option. Domestically, Soviet Jews were being considered a security liability for their Western connections, especially to the United States, and growing national awareness.

With the United States becoming the opponent of the Soviet Union by the end of 1948, the USSR switched sides in the Arab–Israeli conflict and began supporting the Arabs against Israel, first politically and later also militarily. For his part David Ben-Gurion declared support for the United States in the Korean War, despite opposition from left-wing Israeli parties. From 1950 on, Israeli–Soviet relations were an inextricable part of the Cold War—with implications for Soviet Jews supporting Israel, or perceived as supporting it.

== Persecution of Jewish creatives and intelligentsia ==
The campaign included a crusade in the state-controlled mass media to expose literary pseudonyms of Jewish writers by putting their real names in parentheses in order to reveal to the public that they were ethnic Jews.

Thirteen Soviet Jewish poets and writers, five of them members of Jewish Anti-Fascist Committee, were convicted in Moscow on August 12, 1952 for espionage and treason. All but one of the defendants confessed to their crimes.

Historian Benjamin Pinkus has written that the campaign was not initially antisemitic, and "that certain Jews took an active part in the anti-cosmopolitanism campaign". However, Jews were disproportionately targeted in terms of the "frequency of denunciations", "intensity of attacks", and the severity of sanctions. He concludes "...it is no longer possible to doubt the anti-cosmopolitan campaign had acquired a totally Jewish character", and posits several reasons supporting "the view that the anti-cosmopolitan campaign became an out-and-out anti-Jewish campaign".

Czechoslovak Minister of Information and Culture, Václav Kopecký, was known for his diatribes in which he criticized Jews for their alleged Zionism and cosmopolitanism. In December 1951, Kopecký claimed that "the great part of people with a Jewish origin" subscribe to "cosmopolitan thinking". According to Kopecký, the Communist Party of Czechoslovakia was not taking the anti-cosmopolitan campaign seriously enough.

== Legacy ==
Following the campaign, Jewish representation in academia decreased, likely due to discrimination. For example, in 1947, Jews constituted 18 per cent of Soviet scientific workers, but by 1970 this number declined to 7 per cent, which was still higher than about 3 to 4 per cent of the total Soviet population at that time they comprised.

Jewish culture was also often censored by the Soviet government. For example, the Yiddish verse sung by Mikhoels was cut out from the famous lullaby sung in turns by persons of different ethnicities in the Soviet classic 1936 movie Circus, restored during destalinization. Popular government-sponsored Yiddish-language magazines like Der Emes and Sovetish Heymland continued to operate during this time.

American historian and political commentator Walter Ze'ev Laqueur noted: "When, in the 1950s under Stalin, the Jews of the Soviet Union came under severe attack and scores were executed, it was under the banner of anti-Zionism rather than anti-Semitism, which had been given a bad name by Adolf Hitler."

== See also ==
- Israel Moiseevich Gelfand
- Izrail Solomonovich Gradshteyn
- Isaak Moiseevich Yaglom
