= Cecil Hoare =

British parasitologist (1892–1984)

Cecil Hoare FRS
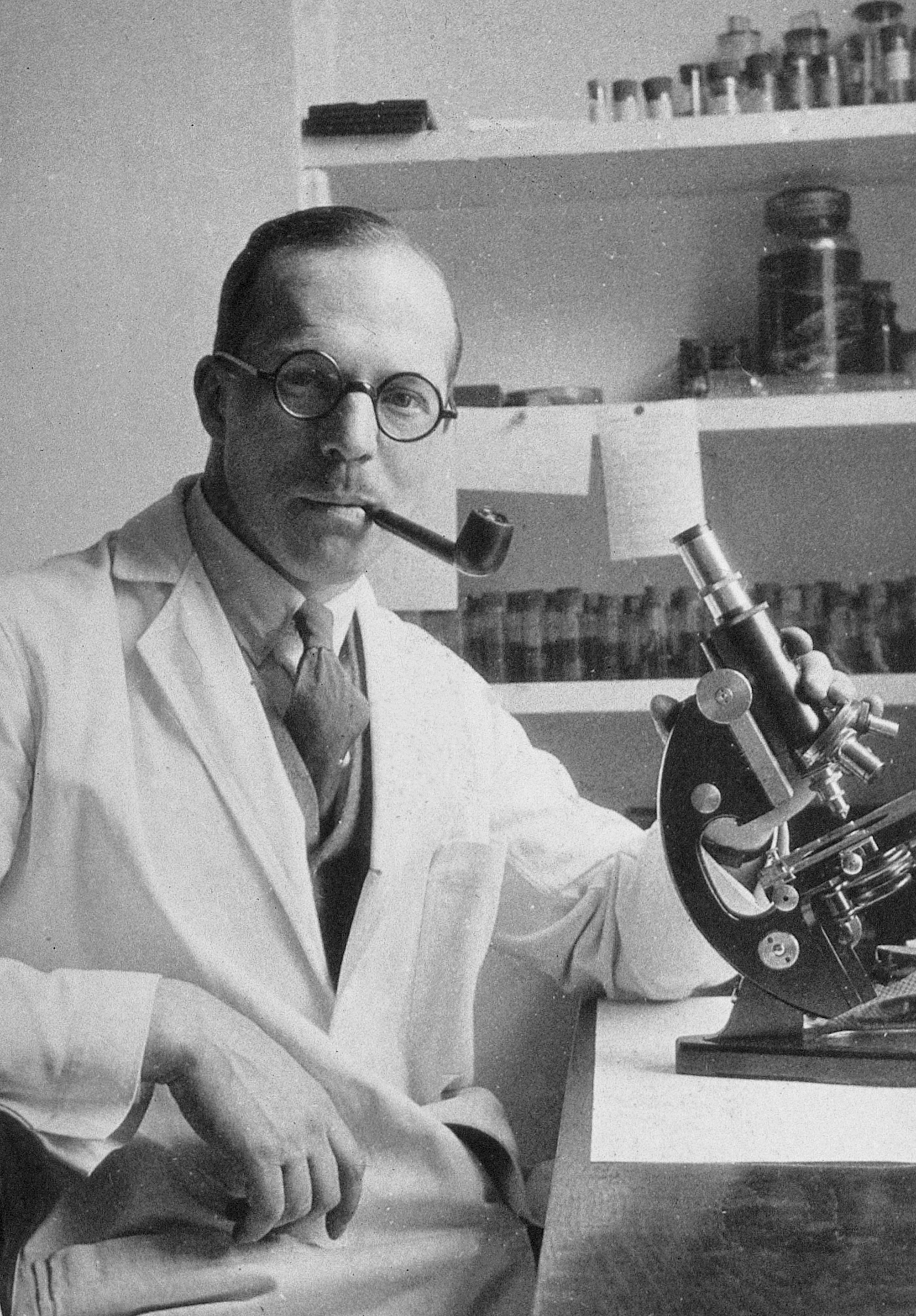
- Cecil Arthur Hoare c. 1930
- Born: 6 March 1892; Middelburg, Netherlands
- Died: 23 August 1984 (aged 92)
- Education: Saint Petersburg State University, Russia
- Spouses: Alexandra Marti; Maria Nikolaevna Leserson
- Awards: Manson Medal (1974)
- Scientific career
- Fields: Protozoology, parasitology

Cecil Arthur Hoare (6 March 1892 – 23 August 1984) FRS was a British protozoologist and parasitologist.

== Early life and education ==
Hoare was born in Middelburg, Netherlands, the illegitimate son of Arthur Stovell Hoare, a journalist working for the British War Office. His Russian-born mother Luboff Shalyte, known as Aimee Challet, was from Vitebsk in Belarus/Bielorussia, where her father was said to be the Mayor. She was a professional operatic singer. Hoare was joined by a sister, Catherine Eleanor Hoare, born in Vlissingen, Netherlands on 10 August 1894. His parents later married in the London Borough of Barnet in 1896,

Luboff, Hoare's mother, took the two elder children to Russia in around 1898, entering Hoare into the Gymnasium school system, apparently leaving his father in England.

Luboff returned to England for a short period in 1905 after which Hoare was joined by a second sister, Lilian Marguerite Hoare born in Fulham in 1906, Shortly after the birth, his parents separated permanently, leaving Lilian to be brought up by her father in England, Luboff returning for the time being to St Petersburg with the elder two children.

He entered Saint Petersburg State University, Russia, in 1912 aged 20, in the Section of Biology, specializing in zoology from his second year. He graduated in 1917, and the British Consulate called him up for military service. He was exempted on medical grounds, as chronic otitis media had cause deafness in one ear since childhood.

== Career ==
Soon after graduating, Hoare was appointed a Research Fellow at the University of Petrograd.

He studied under the tutelage of the Professor of Zoology Valentin Dogiel.

Hoare left Russia in 1920 for England. With the help of professional contacts he quickly gained a position at the National Institute for Medical Research where he began to publish a series of academic papers.

He continued to correspond with his mentor, Dogiel in St Petersburg in these early years, correspondence which reveals a desire to have his Russian text books sent to England and his difficulties settling into life in England.

In 1923, he joined the Wellcome Bureau of Scientific Research in London, under Charles Morley Wenyon. Hoare was appointed Protozoologist, and in later Head of the Department of Protozoology, a post he held for 34 years until his retirement in 1957.

In 1927, Hoare left for an extended secondment to the Uganda Medical Service in Entebbe, Uganda, where he spent two years investigating the lifecycle of the crocodile trypanosomes, Trypanosome Grayi.

Following the Second World War, Hoare continued to publish prolifically, and undertook a number of extended visits in support of his research and colleagues around the world, visiting the United States in 1948, Lisbon, Portugal in 1958 and received a very warm welcome as a native Russian speaker when he visited the Soviet Union in 1959.

== Awards and honours ==
He was made a Fellow of the Royal Society on 16 March 1950.

== Family and personal life ==
In 1915, Hoare married his first wife, Alexandra Marti, born in Malans, Switzerland, but brought up in Russia. She was a professional pianist and taught at the Petrograd Institute of Music. Their marriage was not a happy one, and they broke up when they left Russia.

Following the Russian Revolution in 1917 and the Russian Civil War that followed, Hoare was interned along with other aliens in 1919 in a military prison, likely to have been the Peter and Paul Fortress in St Petersburg. With the help of the British Government he left Russia in 1920 for England. He was joined in England by his mother, and his sister Catherine. He stayed initially with the English family of his father, before establishing himself in Chiswick, London.

Shortly after their arrival in England, Hoare's elder sister Catherine emigrated to the US, becoming a naturalised US citizen in 1928 following her marriage to a Russian emigre, Boris Speshneff-Stafford.

Upon his return from Uganda, around 1930, Hoare met Marie Leserson, who was to become his second wife. They became partners and lived together in the Leserson family home in Chiswick, where Hoare was to spend most of the remainder of his life. Although living as man and wife for many years, the marriage was only formalised in 1954, a few weeks after the death of his first wife Alexandra in April 1954.

Hoare's mother, Luboff, died of rectal cancer in 1931 at the Chelsea Cancer hospital, now known as The Royal Marsden NHS Foundation Trust. Cecil was at her bedside.

In July 1938, MI5 were surveilling Hoare's household in Chiswick, under the mistaken belief that a bolshevik cell was based there.

Hoare's younger sister, Lilian, who had remained in London when their parents' marriage ended, was killed in the London Blitz on 18 September 1940 due to enemy action. The following year, Hoare's elder sister Catherine, now known as Eleanor Stafford, committed suicide in Manhattan following the death of her husband from tuberculosis.
