= I. I. Schmalhausen Institute of Zoology =

Soviet-Ukrainian research institute

I.I. Schmalhausen Institute of Zoology of National Academy of Sciences of Ukraine
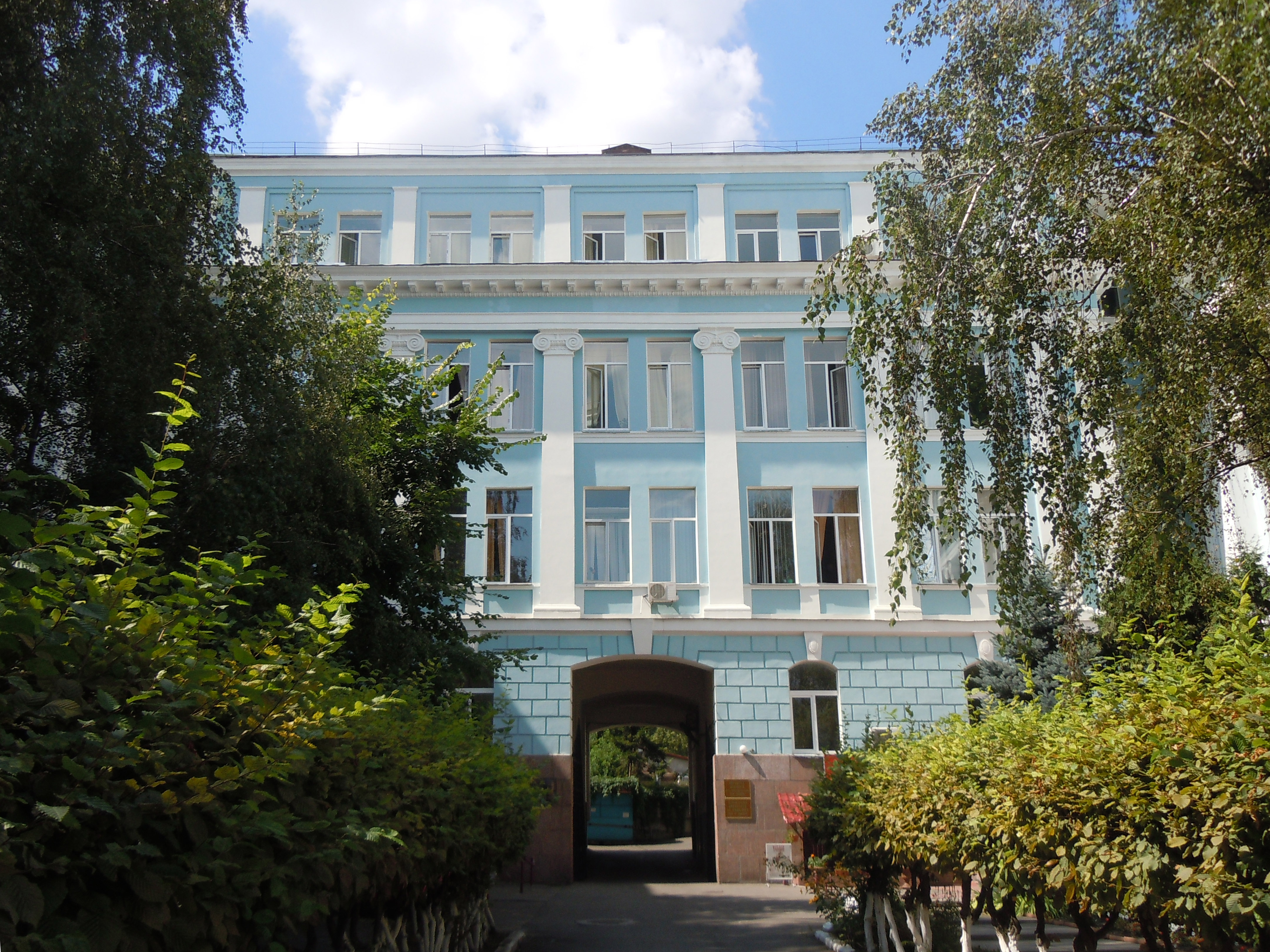
- Abbreviation: SIZK
- Formation: 1930; 96 years ago
- Type: Scientific institute
- Purpose: Research in zoology
- Location: Kyiv, Ukraine
- Parent organization: National Academy of Sciences of Ukraine
- Website: http://www.izan.kiev.ua

The I.I. Schmalhausen Institute of Zoology of National Academy of Sciences of Ukraine (Ukrainian: Інститут зоології ім. І. І. Шмальгаузена Національної академії наук України, romanized: Instytut zoolohii im. I. I. Shmalhauzena Natsionalnoi akademii nauk Ukrainy) is the leading institution in Ukraine doing research in zoology. At present, this is the leading regional center of zoological research and expertise in the Eastern Europe.

The Institute of Zoology was initially founded as The committee for studies of the fauna of Ukraine in 1919 and started its activities in its current form on August 1, 1930. The evolutionary biologist Ivan Schmalhausen was the first director of the institute. Among the scientists of Institute were Aleksandr Markevich, Mykola Szczerbak, Vladislav Monchenko, Boris Balinsky, Sergey Paramonov, Leo Sheljuzhko and many others.

The research is focused on: fauna of Ukraine, evolution and taxonomy of animals; development of policies in conservation and management of wildlife, its monitoring with regard to human activities; zoological background for plant and animal protection.

The Institute of Zoology is the leading Ukrainian center in studies of biodiversity, providing the expertise for implementation of the CBD, the Bonn Convention, the EUROBATS Agreement, evaluation for CITES documents, maintaining the Ukrainian Cadaster of Fauna, contributing to the national programs for establishing new protected areas and mapping the fauna of Ukraine. It permanently contributes into national reporting on the status of animal wildlife in Ukraine. The Institute houses the CITES Coordinating Centre.

The Institute functions as a museum-type, collection housing institution. The collections include more than six million specimens sorted in 267 collection units. The type materials include 18,225 specimens. Also, the Institute houses anatomical preparations (more than 10,000 specimens), histological and paleontological preparations and samples, among them the collection of amber inclusions (more than 20,000 specimens). The collections of the Institute of Zoology are recognized as a part of the national heritage and included into the Ukrainian National Register of Research Objects of National Heritage, which offers the special status of state protection and support.

The Institute of Zoology includes the departments of Invertebrate Fauna and Systematics, Entomology and Collection Management (including the Collections), Applied Entomology, Acarology, Parasitology, Evolutionary and Genetic Systematics, Fauna and Taxonomy of Vertebrates, Evolutionary Morphology and Wildlife Monitoring and Conservation (including the Lab of Population Ecology). There are labs focused on microscopy and molecular genetics, as well as the Ukrainian Bird Tagging Center and Ukrainian Tissue Sample Bank, being established in the institute.

== Structure ==
- Department of Invertebrate Fauna and Systematics
- Department of Entomology and Collection Management (including the Collections)
- Department of Taxonomy of Entomophagous Insects and Ecological Principles of Biocontrol
- Department of Acarology
- Department of Parasitology
- Department of Evolutionary and Genetic Systematics
- Department of Fauna and Systematics of Vertebrates
- Department of Evolutionary morphology of vertebrates
- Department of Wildlife Monitoring and Conservation (including the Lab of Population Ecology)

== Publications ==
- Schmalhausen I. Das Wachstumsgesetz als Gesetz der progressiven Differenzierung // Wilhelm Roux' Archiv Für Entwicklungsmechanik Der Organismen. — 1930. — 123 (1). — S. 153–178.
- Balinsky B. I. Das Extremitätenseitenfeld, Seine Ausdehnung und Beschaffenheit // Wilhelm Roux' Archiv Für Entwicklungsmechanik Der Organismen. — 1933. — 130 (3-4). — S. 704–746.
- Караваєв В. Фауна родини Formicidae (мурашки) України. Ч. 1 і ч 2. — Київ: Видавництво ВУАН, 1934, 1936. — 164 с., 316 с.
- Шмальгаузен И. И. Определение основных понятий и методика исследования роста // Рост животных. — Москва-Ленинград: Государственное издательство медицинской и биологической литературы, 1935. — С. 8-60.
- Агол И. И. Происхождение животных и человека. — Киев: Издательство ВУАН, 1935. — 128 с.
- Балинский Б. И. Развитие зародыша. Проблема детерминации в эмбриональном развитии. — Москва-Ленинград: Биомедгиз, 1936. — 184 с.
- Маркевич О. П. Copepoda parasitica прісних вод СРСР. — Київ: Видавництво АН УРСР, 1937. — 222 с.
- Шарлемань М. Зоогеографія УРСР. Видання 2-е. — Київ: Видавництво АН УРСР, 1937. — 235 с.
- Шарлемань М. Птахи УРСР. — Київ: Видавництво АН УРСР, 1938. — 266 с.
- Мигулін О. О. Звірі УРСР. — Київ: Видавництво АН УРСР, 1938. — 426 с.
- Шмальгаузен И. И. Организм как целое в индивидуальном и историческом развитии. — Москва-Ленинград: Издательство АН СССР, 1938. — 144 с.
- Шмальгаузен И. И. Пути и закономерности эволюционного процесса. — Москва-Ленинград: Издательство АН СССР, 1939. — 232 с.
- Гершензон С. М. Вызывание направленных мутаций у Drosophila melanogaster // Доклады АН СССР^{[ru]}. — 1939. — Т. 25, No. 3. — С. 224–227.
- Шмальгаузен И. И. Изменчивость и смена адаптивных норм в процессе эволюции // Журнал общей биологии. — 1940. — Т. 1, No. 4. — С. 509–525.
- Маркевич О. П. Хвороби прісноводних риб. — Київ-Львів: Видавництво АН УРСР, 1940. — 168 с.
- Парамонов С. Я. Фауна СССР^{[ru]}. Двукрылые. Том 9. Вып. 2. Сем. Bombyliidae (подсем. Bombyliinae). — Москва—Ленинград: Издательство АН СССР, 1940. — 416 с.
- Шмальгаузен И. И. Стабилизирующий отбор и его место среди факторов эволюции // Журнал общей биологии. — 1941. — Т. 2, No. 3. — С. 307–350.
- Гершензон С. М. «Мобилизационный резерв» внутривидовой изменчивости // Журнал общей биологии. — 1941. — Т. 2, No. 1. — С. 85–107.
- Теленга Н. А. Фауна СССР^{[ru]}. Перепончатокрылые. Том 5. Вып. 3. Braconidae (ч. 2). — Москва—Ленинград: Издательство АН СССР, 1941. — 466 с.
- Пидопличко И. Г. О ледниковом периоде. Вып. 1. Возникновение и развитие учения о ледниковом периоде. — Киев: Издательство Киевского университета, 1946. — 172 с.
- Гершензон С. М. Роль естественного отбора в распространении и динамике меланизма у хомяков // Журнал общей биологии. — 1946. — Т. 7, No. 2. — С. 97–130.
- Касьяненко В. Г. Аппарат движения и опоры лошади (функциональный анализ). — Киев: Издательство АН УССР, 1947. — 96 с.
- Гершензон С. М., Зильберман Р. А., Левочкина О. Л., Ситько П. О., Тарнавский Н. Д. Вызывание мутаций у Drosophila тимонуклеиновой кислотой // Журнал общей биологии. — 1948. — Т. 9, No. 2. — С. 69–88.
- Третъяков Д. К. Рыбы и круглоротые, их жизнь и значение. — Москва-Ленинград: Издательство АН СССР, 1949. — 419 с.
- Маркевич А. П. Паразитофауна пресноводных рыб УССР. — Киев: Издательство АН УССР, 1951. — 376 с.
- Пидопличко И. Г. О ледниковом периоде. Вып. 2. Биологические и географические особенности европейских представителей четвертичной фауны. — Киев: Издательство АН УССР, 1951. — 264 с.
- Белановский И. Д. Тахины УССР. — Киев: Издательство АН УССР, 1951. — Ч. 1. —191 с.; 1952. — Ч. 2. — 240 с.
- Пучков В. Г. Вредители и болезни сахарной свеклы. — Москва: Сельхозгиз, 1952. — 225 с.
- Синицкий Н. Н., Гершензон С. М., Ситько П. О., Карлаш Е. В. Разведение дубового шелкопряда. — Киев: Издательство АН УССР, 1952. — 180 с.
- Воїнственсъкий М. А., Кістяківський О. Б. Визначник птахів УРСР. — Київ: Радянська школа, 1952. — 351 с.
- Свириденко П. А. Мышевидные грызуны и защита от них урожая, запасов продуктов и древесных культур. 2-е издание, дополненное. — Киев: Издательство АН УССР, 1953. — 124 с.
- Маркевич А. П. Паразитические веслоногие рыб СССР. — Киев: Издательство АН УССР, 1956. — 259 с.
- Сокур І. Т. Історичні зміни та використання фауни ссавців України. — Київ: Видавництво АН УРСР, 1961. — 84 с.
- Савченко Е. Н. Фауна СССР^{[ru]}. Двукрылые. Том 2. Вып. 3/4. Комары-долгоножки (сем. Tipulidae). Подсем. Tipulinae: Род Tipula. — Москва-Ленинград: Издательство АН СССР, 1961: Ч. 1, 487 с.; 1964: Ч. 2, 503 с.
- Кровосисні членистоногі, їх медико-ветеринарне значення та заходи боротьби / О. П. Маркевич, Г. В. Бошко, Е. М. Емчук, Г. К. Шевченко. — Київ: Наукова думка, 1964. — 142 с.
- Nekrutenko Y. P. 'Gynandromorphic effect' and the optical nature of hidden wing-pattern in Gonepteryx rhamni L. (Lepidoptera, Pieridae) // Nature. — 1965. — 205 (4969). — P. 417–418.
- Щербак Н. Н. Земноводные и пресмыкающиеся Крыма. — Киев: Наукова думка, 1966. — 240 с.
- Топачевский В. А. Фауна СССР^{[ru]}. Млекопитаюшие. Том 3. Вып. 3. Слепышовые (Spalacidae). — Ленинград: Наука, 1969. — 248 с.
- Липа О. Л., Федоренко А. П. Заповідники та пам'ятки природи України. — Київ: Урожай, 1969. — 186 с.
- Савченко Е. Н. Фауна СССР^{[ru]}. Двукрылые. Том 2. Вып. 5. Комары-долгоножки (сем. Tipulidae). Подсем. Тіpulinae (окончание) и Flabelliferinae. — Ленинград: Наука, 1973. — 282 с.
- Біологічний словник / За ред. І. Г. Підоплічка, К. М. Ситника, Р. В. Чаговця. — Київ: Головна редакція УРЕ, 1974. — 551 с.
- Щербак Н. Н. Ящурки Палеарктики. — Киев: Наукова думка, 1974. — 294 с.
- Определитель паразитов позвоночных Черного и Азовского морей. — Киев: Наукова думка, 1975. — 553 с. (серед авторів Н. І. Іскова, В. В. Корнюшин, О. П. Маркевич і Л. О. Смогоржевська)
- Смогоржевская Л. А. Гельминты водоплавающих и болотных птиц фауны Украины. — Киев: Наукова думка, 1976. — 416 с.
- Шарпило В. П. Паразитические черви пресмыкающихся фауны СССР: систематика, хорология, биология. — Киев: Наукова думка, 1976. — 285 с.
- Зерова М. Д. Фауна СССР^{[ru]}. Перепончатокрылые. Том 7. Вып. 6. Хальциды сем. Eurytomidae, подсемейства Rileyinae и Harmolitinae. — Mосква: Наука, 1976. — 230 с.
- Банников А. Г., Даревский И. С., Ищенко В. Г., Рустамов А. К., Щербак Н. Н. Определитель земноводных и пресмыкающихся фауны СССР. — Москва: Просвещение, 1977. — 414 с.
- Frantsevich L., Govardovski V., Gribakin F., Nikolajev G., Pichka V., Polanovsky A., Shevchenko V., Zolotov V. Astroorientation in Lethrus (Coleoptera, Scarabaeidae) // Journal of Comparative Physiology A. — 1977. — 121 (2). — P. 253–271.
- Долин В. Г. Определитель личинок жуков-щелкунов фауны СССР. — Киев: Урожай, 1978. — 125 с.
- Колодочка Л. А. Руководство по определению растениеобитающих клещей-фитосейид. — Киев: Наукова думка, 1978. — 78 с.
- Мажуга П. М. Кровеносные капилляры и ретикуло-эндотелиальная система костного мозга. — Киев: Наукова думка, 1978. — 191 с.
- Францевич Л. И. Зрительный анализ пространства у насекомых. — Киев: Наукова думка, 1980. — 288 с.
- Щербак Г. И. Клещи семейства Rhodacaridae фауны Палеарктики. — Киев: Наукова думка, 1980. — 217 с.
- Червона книга Української РСР. — Київ: Наукова думка, 1980. — 499 с.
- Трач В. Н. Паразитические личинки стронгилят домашних жвачных животных. — Киев: Наукова думка, 1982. — 128 с.
- Маркевич О. П., Татарко К. І. Російсько-український-латинський словник зоологічної термінології і номенклатури. — Київ: Наукова думка, 1983. — 412 с.
- Савченко Е. Н. Фауна СССР^{[ru]}. Двукрылые. Том 2. Вып. 1/2. Комары-долгоножки семейства Tipulidae: Общая часть и начало систематической части. Подсем. Dolchopezinae, подсем. Tipulinae (начало). — Ленинград: Наука, 1983. — 584 с.
- Ковтун М. Ф. Строение и эволюция органов локомоции рукокрылых. — Киев: Наукова думка, 1984. — 304 с.
- Єрмоленко В. М. Атлас комах-шкідників польових культур. — Київ: Урожай, 1984. — 128 с.
- Акимов И. А. Биологические основы вредоносности акароидных клещей. — Киев: Наукова думка, 1985. — 160 с.
- Природа Украинской ССР. Животный мир / В. А. Топачевский, В. И. Монченко, В. Г. Долин и др. — Киев: Наукова думка, 1985. — 240 с.
- Біологічний словник. 2-е видання / Ред. Ситник К. М., Топачевский В. О. — Київ: Головна редакція УРЕ, 1986. — 680 с.
- Щербак Н. Н., Голубев М. Л. Гекконы фауны СССР и сопредельных стран: Определитель. — Киев: Наукова думка, 1986. — 232 с.
- Заповедники СССР: Заповедники Украины и Молдавии. — Москва: Мысль, 1987. — 279 с. (серед авторів М. А. Воїнственський і А. П. Федоренко)
- Вредители сельскохозяйственных культур и лесных насаждений: В 3-х томах. 2-е издание, испр. и доп. — Киев: Урожай, 1987. — Том 1. — 440 с.; 1988. — Том 2. — 576 с.; 1989. — Том 3. — 406 с. (серед авторів М. Д. Зерова, В. Г. Долін, В. О. Мамонтова, В. О. Корнєєв, З. С. Гершензон, З. Ф. Ключко, В. Г. Пучков, В. М. Логвиненко, Є. М. Терезникова, В. М. Єрмоленко, О. Г. Радченко, Ю. П. Некрутенко, В. М. Стовбчатий, Ю. О. Костюк, І. Т. Сокур, В. І. Монченко, О. О. Байдашніков та ін.)
- Редкие и исчезающие растения и животные Украины: Справочник. — Киев: Наукова думка, 1988. — 254 с. (серед авторів М. М. Щербак, В. П. Жежерін, В. І. Крижанівський, Ю. В. Мовчан і Ю. П. Некрутенко)
- Акимов И. А., Горголь В. Т. Хищные и паразитические клещи-хейлетиды. — Киев: Наукова думка, 1990. — 120 с.
- Францевич Л. И., Гайченко В. А., Крыжановский В. И. Животные в радиоактивной зоне. – Киев: Наукова думка, 1991. – 127 с.
- Энтомофаги вредителей яблони юго-запада СССР / М. Д. Зерова, В. И. Толканиц, А. Г. Котенко и др. — Киев: Наукова думка, 1991. — 276 с.
- Насекомые-галообразователи культурных и дикорастущих растений европейской части СССР: Равнокрылые, чешуекрылые, жесткокрылые, полужесткокрылые / М. Д. Зерова, В. А. Мамонтова, В. М. Ермоленко и др. — Киев: Наукова думка, 1991. — 343 с.
- Пчелиный клещ Varroa jacobsoni / И. А. Акимов, О. Ф. Гробов, И. В. Пилецкая и др. — Киев: Наукова думка, 1993. — 256 с.
- Акимов И. А., Колодочка Л. А. Хищные клещи в закрытом грунте. — Киев: Наукова думка, 1993. — 144 с.
- Червона книга України. Тваринний світ / ред. М. М. Щербак. — Київ: Українська енциклопедія, 1994. — 460 с.
- Радченко В. Г., Песенко Ю. А. Биология пчел (Hymenoptera, Apoidea). — Санкт-Петербург, 1994. — 350 с.
- Двойнос Г. М., Харченко В. А. Стронгилиды домашних и диких лошадей. — Киев: Наукова думка, 1994. — 232 с.
- Keys to the Cestode Parasite of Vertebrates / edited by L. Khalil, A. Jones, R. Bray. — Wallingford: CAB International, 1994. — 768 pp. (В. В. Корнюшин співавтор двох розділів pp. 559–593)
- Зерова М. Д. Паразитические перепончатокрылые Эвритомины и Эвдекатомины Палеарктики. — Киев: Наукова думка, 1995. — 456 с.
- Gorb S. N. Design of insect unguitractor apparatus // Journal of Morphology^{[en]}. — 1996. — 230 (2). — P. 219–230.
- Gerschenson Z. S., Ulenberg S. F. The Yponomeutinae (Lepidoptera) of the World exclusive of Americas. — Amsterdam, Oxford, New York, Tokyo, 1998. — 202 p.
- Емельянов И. Г. Разнообразие и его роль в функциональной устойчивости и эволюции экосистем. — Киев: МСУ, 1999. — 168 с.
- Fruit flies (Diptera: Tephritidae): Phylogeny and Evolution of Behavior. — Boca Raton, London, New York, Washington: CRC Press, 1999. — 984 pp. (В. О. Корнєєв автор трьох розділів, pp. 3–22, 73–114, 549–580)
- Monchenko V. I., Von Vaupel Klein J. C. Oligomerization in Copepoda Cyclopoida as a kind of orthogenetic evolution in the Animal Kingdom // Crustaceana^{[en]}. — 1999. — 72 (3). — P. 241–264.
- Tkach V. V., Pawlowski J., Sharpilo V. P. Molecular and morphological differentiation between species of the Plagiorchis vespertilionis group (Digenea, Plagiorchiidae) occurring in European bats, with a re-description of P. vespertilionis (Muller, 1780) // Systematic Parasitology. — 2000. — 47 (1). — P. 9-22.
- Gorb S. N. Attachment devices of Insect Cuticle. — Dordrecht: Kluwer Academic Publishers, 2001. — 305 p.
- Scherge M., Gorb S. N. Biological Micro-and Nanotribology: Nature's Solutions. — New York: Springer, 2001. — 304 p.
- Фесенко Г. В., Бокотей А. А. Птахи фауни України. — Київ: УТОП, 2002. − 416 с.
- Dovgal I. V. Evolution, phylogeny and classification of Suctorea (Ciliophora) // Protistology. — 2002. — 2 (4). — P. 194–270.
- Rodionova N. V., Oganov V. S., Zolotova N. V. Ultrastructural changes in osteocytes in microgravity conditions // Advances in Space Research^{[en]}. — 2002. — 30 (4). — p. 765—770.
- Міжнародний кодекс зоологічної номенклатури / Перекладач та упорядник Ю. П. Некрутенко. — 4-е вид. — Київ: Бібліотека офіційних видань, 2003. — 175 с
- Давыдов О. Н., Темниханов Ю. Д. Болезни пресноводных рыб. — Киев: Ветинформ, 2003. — 544 с.
- Olson P. D., Cribb T. H., Tkach V. V., Bray R. A., Littlewood D. T. J. Phylogeny and classification of the Digenea (Platyhelminthes: Trematoda) // International Journal for Parasitology. — 2003. — 33 (7). — P. 733–755.
- Kuzmin Y., Tkach V. V., Snyder S. D. The nematode genus Rhabdias (Nematoda: Rhabdiasidae) from amphibians and reptiles of the Nearctic // Comparative Parasitology. — 2003. — 70 (2). — P. 101–114.
- Фауна печер України / Ред. І. Загороднюк. — Київ, 2004. — 248 с.
- Frantsevich L., Gorb S. Structure and mechanics of the tarsal chain in the hornet, Vespa crabro (Hymenoptera: Vespidae): implications on the attachment mechanism // Arthropod Structure & Development. — 2004. — 33 (1). — P. 77–89.
- Kuzmina T. A., Kharchenko V. A., Starovir A. I., Dvojnos G. M. Analysis of the strongylid nematodes (Nematoda: Strongylidae) community after deworming of brood horses in Ukraine // Veterinary Parasitology. — 2005. — 131 (3). — P. 283–290.
- Некрутенко Ю., Чиколовець В. Денні метелики України — Київ: Видавництво Раєвського, 2005. — 232 с.
- Родіонова Н. В. Цитологічні механізми перебудов у кістках при гіпокінезії та мікрогравітації. — Київ: Наукова думка, 2006. — 238 с.
- Вплив радіаційного фактора Чорнобильської зони відчуження на організм тварин. — Київ: «Атіка», 2006. — 320 с.
- Ключко З. Ф. Совки України. — Київ: Видавництво Раєвського, 2006. — 248с.
- Kuzmina T.A., Kuzmin Y. I., Kharchenko V. A. Field study on the survival, migration and overwintering of infective larvae of horse strongyles on pasture in central Ukraine // Veterinary Parasitology. — 2006. — 141 (3-4). — P. 264–272.
- Зерова М. Д., Микитенко Г. Н., Нарольский Н. Б., Гершензон З. С., Свиридов С. В., Лукаш О. В., Бабидорич М. М. Каштановая минирующая моль в Украине. — Киев, 2007. — 87 с.
- Давыдов О. Н. Глистные болезни человека, приобретаемые от животных. — Киев: «ИНКОС», 2007. — 112 с.
- Давыдов О. Н. Инфекционные болезни человека, приобретаемые от животных. — Киев: Институт зоологии им. И. И. Шмальгаузена НАН Украины, 2008. — 220 с.
- Межжерин С. В. Животные ресурсы Украины в свете стратегии устойчивого развития. — Киев: Логос, 2008. — 282 с.
- Kuzmina T. A., Kharchenko V. O. Anthelmintic resistance in cyathostomins of brood horses in Ukraine and influence of anthelmintic treatments on strongylid community structure // Veterinary Parasitology. — 2008. — 154 (3-4). — P. 277–288.
- Dzeverin I. The stasis and possible patterns of selection in evolution of a group of related species from the bat genus Myotis (Chiroptera, Vespertilionidae) // Journal of Mammalian Evolution^{[en]}. — 2008. — V. 15, No. 2. — P. 123–142.
- Червона книга України. Тваринний світ / ред. І. А. Акімов. — Київ: Глобалконсалтинг, 2009. — 600 с.
- Putshkov P. V., Moulet P. Faune de France. Hemipteres Reduviidae d'Europe Occidentale. — Paris: Federation Francaise des Societes de Sciences Naturtlles, 2009. — 668 p.
- Vargovitsh R. S. New cave Arrhopalitidae (Collembola: Symphypleona) from the Crimea (Ukraine) // Zootaxa. — 2009. — 2047. — P. 1-47.
- Radchenko A., Elmes G. W. Myrmica ants (Hymenoptera: Formicidae) of the Old World. — Warszawa: Museum and Institute of Zoology, 2010. — 789 pp.
- Фауна України: охоронні категорії. Видання друге, перероблене та доповнене / О. Годлевська, І. Парнікоза, В. Різун, Г. Фесенко, Ю. Куцоконь, І. Загороднюк, М. Шевченко, Д. Іноземцева. — Київ: Інститут зоології НАН України, 2010. — 80 с.
- Акимов И. А., Жовнерчук О. В. Тетранихоидные клещи — вредители зелених насаждений мегаполиса. — Киев, 2011. — 135 с.
- Давыдов О. Н., Неборачек С. И., Куровская Л. Я., Лысенко В. Н. Экология паразитов рыб водоемов Украины. — Киев. 2011. — 492 с.
- Гумовський О. В. Їздці родини Eulophidae (Hymenoptera: Chalcidoidea): cистематика, морфологія і біологічні особливості. — Київ: Наукова думка, 2012. — 216 c.
- Мамонтова В. А. Тли семейства ляхнид (Homoptera, Aphidoidea, Lachnidae) фауны Восточной Европы и сопредельных территорий. — Киев: Наукова думка, 2012. — 389 c.
- Kuzmin Y. Review of Rhabdiasidae (Nematoda) from the Holarctic // Zootaxa. — 2013. — 3639 (1). — P. 1-76.
- Шквиря М. Г., Улюра Є. М., Гальперіна Л. П. Керівництво з утримання вовка, рисі та ведмедя бурого в умовах неволі (в центрах порятунку і реабілітації, зоологічних колекціях, притулках, куточках живої природи). — Київ: Міжгалузевий науково-дослідний центр менеджменту та інновацій, 2013. — 153 с.
- Кононова С. В. Теленомины Палеарктики (Hymenoptera, Scelionidae). — Киев: Наукова думка, 2014. — 484 c.
- Iakovenko N. S., Smykla J., Convey P., ... Janko K. Antarctic bdelloid rotifers: diversity, endemism and evolution // Hydrobiologia^{[en]}. — 2015. — 761 (1). — P. 5—43.
- Ведмідь бурий (Ursus arctos) в Україні: проблеми збереження та дослідження популяції в Україні / ред. І. Дикий, М. Шквиря. — Київ, 2015. — 144 с.
- Акимов И. А., Небогаткин И. В. Иксодовые клещи городских ландшафтов Киева. — Киев: Институт зоологии НАН Украины, 2016. — 156 с.
- Радченко А. Г. Муравьи (Hymenoptera, Formicidae) Украины. — Киев: Институт зоологии НАН Украины, 2016. — 495 с.
- Балашов И. Охрана наземных моллюсков Украины. — Киев: Институт зоологии НАН Украины, 2016. — 272 с.
- Kameneva E. P., Korneyev V. A. Revision of the genus Physiphora Fallén 1810 (Diptera: Ulidiidae: Ulidiinae) // Zootaxa. — 2016. — 4087 (1). — P. 1—88.
- Gumovsky A. A review of genera and described Afrotropical species of Tetracampinae (Hymenoptera: Tetracampidae), with description of a new genus from East Central Africa // Zootaxa. — 2016. — 4111 (4). — P. 393–420.
- Kuzmina T. A., Dzeverin I. I., Kharchenko V. A. Strongylids in domestic horses: Influence of horse age, breed and deworming programs on the strongyle parasite community // Veterinary Parasitology. — 2016. — 227. — P. 56–63.
- Gol'din P., Startsev D. A systematic review of cetothere baleen whales (Cetacea, Cetotheriidae) from the Late Miocene of Crimea and Caucasus, with a new genus // Papers in Palaeontology. — 2016. — 3 (1). — P. 49–68.
- Didyk Y. M., Blaňárová L., Pogrebnyak S., Akimov I., Peťko B., Víchová B. Emergence of tick-borne pathogens (Borrelia burgdorferi sensu lato, Anaplasma phagocytophilum, Ricketsia raoultii and Babesia microti) in the Kyiv urban parks, Ukraine // Ticks and Tick-borne Diseases. — 2017. — 8 (2). — P. 219–225.
- Ghazali M., Moratelli R., Dzeverin I. Ecomorph Evolution in Myotis (Vespertilionidae, Chiroptera) // Journal of Mammalian Evolution^{[en]}. — 2017. — V. 24, No. 4. — P. 475–484.
- Gumovsky A., Perkovsky E., Rasnitsyn A. Laurasian ancestors and «Gondwanan» descendants of Rotoitidae (Hymenoptera: Chalcidoidea): What a review of Late Cretaceous Baeomorpha revealed // Cretaceous Research. — 2018. — 84. — P. 286–322.
- Svetlichny L., Larsen P., Kiørboe T. Swim and fly: escape strategy in neustonic and planktonic copepods // Journal of Experimental Biology^{[en]}. — 2018. — 221 (2).
- Yunakov N., Nazarenko V., Filimonov R., Volovnik S. A survey of the weevils of Ukraine (Coleoptera: Curculionoidea) // Zootaxa. — 2018. — 4404. — P. 1–494.
- Пучков А. В. Жуки-жужелицы (Coleoptera, Carabidae) трансформированных ценозов Украины. — Киев: Институт зоологии НАН Украины, 2018. — 448 с.
- Фесенко Г. В. Вітчизняна номенклатура птахів світу. — Кривий Ріг: Діонат, 2018. — 580 с.
- Котенко Тетяна Іванівна. Публікації про охорону природи Степової зони України. — Київ: LAT&K, 2018. — 426 с. (упорядник О. Василюк)
- Yaryhin O., Werneburg I. Tracing the developmental origin of a lizard skull: Chondrocranial architecture, heterochrony, and variation in lacertids // Journal of Morphology^{[en]}. — 2018. — 279 (8). — P. 1058–1087.
- Шевченко А. С., Колодочка Л. А. Сообщества орибатид (Acari, Oribatida) почв мегаполиса. — Киев, 2018. — 126 с.
- Енциклопедія мігруючих видів диких тварин України / під загальною редакцією Полуди А. М. — Київ: Міністерство екології та природних ресурсів України, НАН України, 2018. — 694 с.
- Frantsevich L., Shumakova I., Gladun D. Mechanical and optical properties of the femoral chordotonal organ in beetles (Coleoptera) // Journal of Experimental Biology^{[en]}. — 2019. — 222 (21).
- Cruaud A., ... Gumovsky A., ... Rasplus J.-Y. Optimized DNA extraction and library preparation for minute arthropods: Application to target enrichment in chalcid wasps used for biocontrol // Molecular Ecology Resources. — 2019. 19 (3). — P. 702–710.
- Korneyev S.V., Korneyev V.A. Revision of the Old World species of the genus Tephritis (Diptera, Tephritidae) with a pair of isolated apical spots // Zootaxa. — 2019. — 4584 (1). — P. 1—73.
- Varga O. Taxonomy and distribution of pimpline parasitoids (Hymenoptera, Ichneumonidae, Pimplinae) in Ukraine // Zootaxa. — 2019. — 4693 (1). — P. 1—65.
- Lisitsyna O.I., Kudlai O., Smit N.J., Cribb T.H. Three new species of acanthocephalans (Palaeacanthocephala) from marine fishes collected off the East Coast of South Africa // Folia Parasitologica. — 2019. — 66. — 012.
- Vargovitsh R. S. Cave water walker: an extremely troglomorphic Troglaphorura gladiator gen. et sp. nov. (Collembola, Onychiuridae) from Snezhnaya Cave in the Caucasus // Zootaxa. — 2019. — 4619 (2). — P. 267–284.
- Perkovsky E. E., Martynova K. V., ... Perrichot V. A golden age for ectoparasitoids of Embiodea: Cretaceous Sclerogibbidae (Hymenoptera, Chrysidoidea) from Kachin (Myanmar), Charentes (France) and Choshi (Japan) ambers // Gondwana Research^{[en]}. — 2020. — 87. — P. 1—22.
- Dzeverin I. The skull integration pattern and internal constraints in Myotis myotis–Myotis blythii species group (Vespertilionidae, Chiroptera) might be shaped by natural selection during evolution along the genetic line of least resistance // Evolutionary Biology. — 2020. — 47(1). — P. 18–42.
- Korneyev S.V., Smit J.T., Hulbert D.L., Norrbom, A.L., Gaimari, S.D., Korneyev V.A., Smith, J.J. Phylogeny of the genus Tephritis Latreille, 1804 (Diptera: Tephritidae) // Arthropod Systematics and Phylogeny. — 2020. — 78 (1). — P. 111–132.
- Svetlichny L., Larsen P., Kiørboe T. Kinematic and dynamic scaling of copepod swimming // Fluids. — 2020. — 68 (5). — P. 1—28.
- Kuzmina T.A., Kuzmin Y., Dzeverin I., Lisitsyna O.I., Spraker T.R., Korol E.M., Kuchta R. Review of metazoan parasites of the northern fur seal (Callorhinus ursinus) and the analysis of the gastrointestinal helminth community of the population on St. Paul Island, Alaska // Parasitology Research. — 2020. — 1–16.
- European Breeding Bird Atlas 2: Distribution, Abundance and Change. — Barcelona: European Bird Census Council & Lynx Edicions, 2020. — 960 pp. (Н. С. Атамась серед 348 авторів видових нарисів)
- Balashov I.A., Neiber M.T., Hausdorf B. Phylogeny, species delimitation and population structure of the steppe inhabiting land snail genus Helicopsis (Gastropoda: Geomitridae) in Eastern Europe // Zoological Journal of the Linnean Society. — 2020 (2021). — P. 1–18.
- Davydenko S., Shevchenko T., Ryabokon T., Tretiakov R., Gol'din P. A giant Eocene whale from Ukraine uncovers early cetacean adaptations to the fully aquatic life // Evolutionary Biology. 2021.
