= Nikolai Severtsov =

Russian explorer and naturalist (1827–1885)

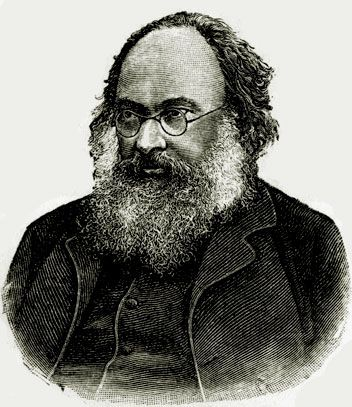
- Born: 5 November 1827; Petrovskoye village, Bobrovsky Uyezd, Voronezh Governorate, Russian Empire
- Died: 7 February 1885 (aged 57); Bobrovsky Uyezd, Voronezh Governorate
- Scientific career
- Fields: naturalist

Nikolai Alekseyevich Severtsov (Russian: Николай Алексеевич Северцов; 5 November 1827 – 7 February 1885) was a Russian explorer and naturalist. He was among the early promoters of Darwinian ideas in Russia.

== Life and work ==
Severtsov was born in Khvoshchevatovo, Zemlyansky district, Voronezh, where his father Aleksey Petrovich was a retired guard officer who had served in the Patriotic War of 1812, losing an arm in the Battle of Borodino. He had become interested in natural history after reading Buffon's work as a child and going out on hunts. and studied at the Moscow University where he was influenced by Karl Rouillier who considered what Haeckel called as ecology as "general zoology". His master's dissertation was on the seasonal life of animals in Voronezh province. At the age of eighteen he came into contact with Grigory Karelin and took an interest in central Asia. In 1855 he applied for an associate professor position but failed to be appointed. In 1857, he joined a mission to Syr-Darya. On the expedition to the Syr Darya, he was captured by Kokand people near Fort Perovsky and freed only after a month. He was posted under the Ural Cossack Army from 1860 to 1862. In 1864 he served in the Kokand campaign under Mikhail Chernyayev and was involved in topographic surveys. He made scientific studies, collecting nearly 12 thousand specimens during this period and received an honorary doctoral degree. In 1865–68, he explored the Tian Shan mountains and Issyk-Kul lake. In 1877–78, he explored the Pamir Mountains, following a route close to the current Pamir Highway as far as Lake Yashil Kul on the Ghunt River.

Severtsov wrote with great reluctance according to his student Menzbier. One of his works was the Vertical and Horizontal Distribution of Turkestan Wildlife (1873), which included the first description of a number of animals. Among them is a subspecies of argali (wild sheep) later named after him: Ovis ammon severtzovi. He also described many new species and subspecies of birds. The spotted great rosefinch, Carpodacus rubicilla severtzovi, is among those named after him.

Severtsov wrote on the geographical variations of birds, which was termed by him as "zoological ethnography". This work attracted Darwin's interest. In 1875 Severtsov visited Darwin in England. Severtsov began to assemble a collection of birds in the estate of Petrovskoe. On 7 February 1885, he was returning home in a carriage along the frozen Ikorts river that feeds into the Don. The carriage broke the ice and plunged. While everyone extricated themselves and attempted to find a warm place nearby, he delayed by searching for his portfolio and collapsed. His driver froze to death.

The Institute of Ecology and Evolution of the Russian Academy of Sciences in Moscow is named after his son Alexei Severtsov (1866-1936).
