= Vladimir Shevyakov =

Russian zoologist

Vladimir Timofeyevich Shevyakov
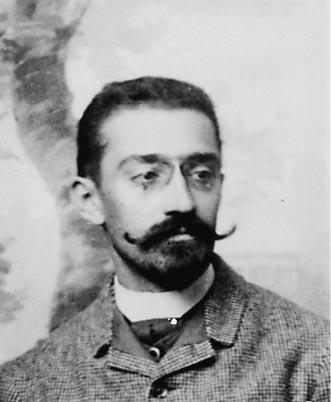
- Born: 29 October 1859; Saint Petersburg
- Died: 18 October 1930 (aged 70); Irkutsk
- Scientific career
- Fields: zoology, protistology
- Doctoral advisor: Otto Bütschli, Konstantin Mereschkowski
- Doctoral students: Valentin Dogiel, Vladimir Beklemishev, Yuri Filipchenko

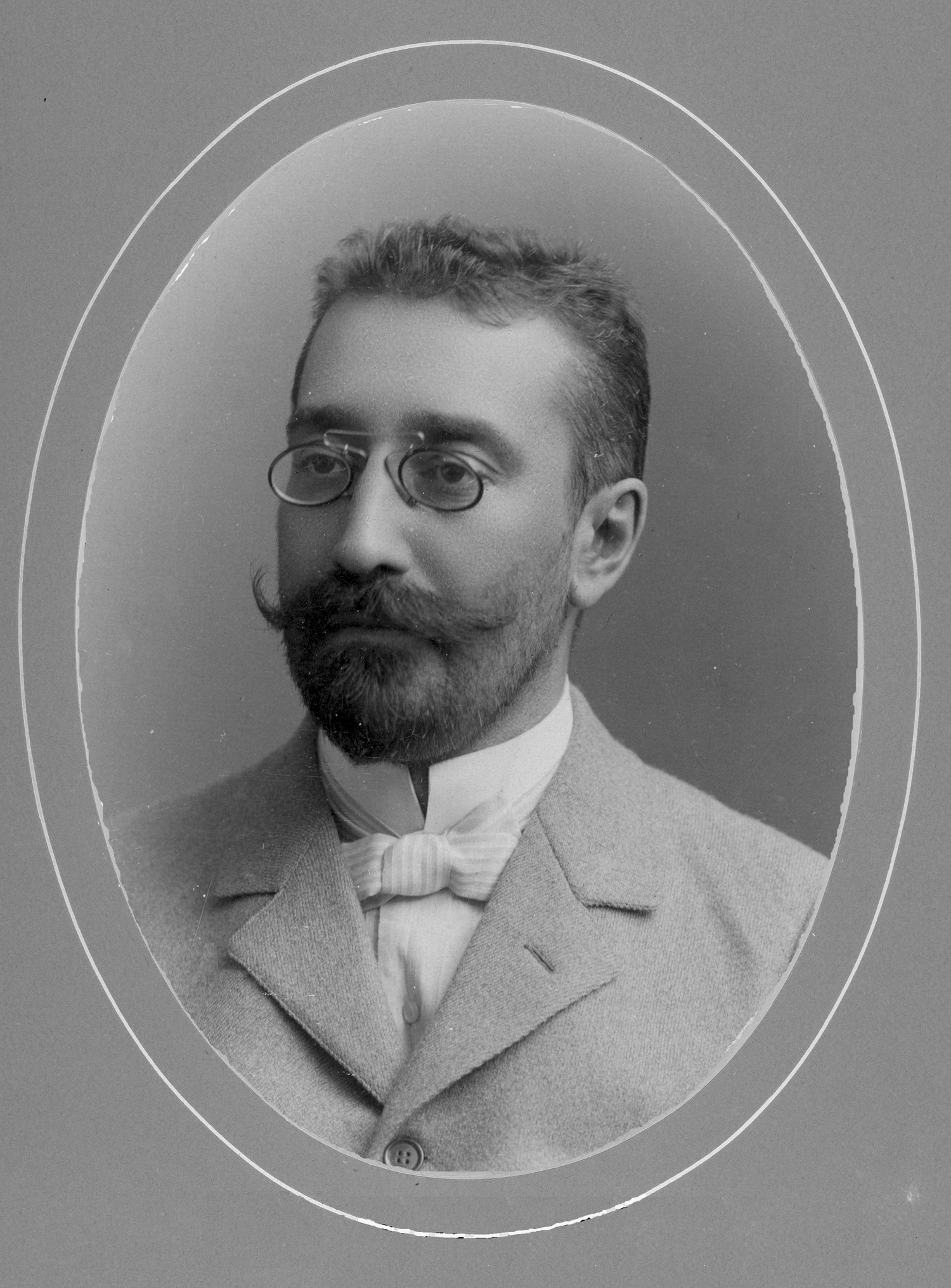

Vladimir Timofeyevich Shevyakov (Russian: Владимир Тимофеевич Шевяков; 29 October 1859, St. Petersburg – 18 October 1930, Irkutsk) publishing under the German spelling of his name as W. Shewiakoff, was a Russian biologist who worked on Protozoa, and a professor.

Shevyakov studied under Konstantin Mereschkowski in St. Petersburg and Otto Bütschli at the University of Heidelberg. He was married to Lydia Kovalevskaya, the youngest daughter of Alexander Kovalevsky. Shevyakov, together with Konstantin Arsenyev, was editor-in-chief of additional volumes of the Brockhaus and Efron Encyclopedic Dictionary. He was a professor at St. Petersburg University until 1911 when he left science and became a vice-minister in the government of Tsar Nicholas. During the revolution he and his family moved first to Perm in Ural and in 1920 he became professor in Irkutsk.

He is mainly known for his work on Radiolaria, Ciliata and Acantharea. He described many taxa.

== Works ==
- Über die karyokinetische Kerntheilung der Euglypha alveolata. "Morphologische Jahrbuch" 13, ss. 193–258 (1888)
- Man wünscht eine genaue anatomische und histologische Untersuchung der Randkörper der Meduse Charybdea mit besonderer Rücksicht auf die Augenbildungen und womöglich unter Berücksichtigung der Augen verwandter Medusen. Beiträge zur Kenntniss des Acalephenauges (1888)
- Schewiakoff W, Grassi B. Beiträge zur Kenntnis des Megastoma entericum. "Zeitschrift für wissenschaftliche Zoologie" 46, s. 143–154 + Pl. 15 (1888)
- Beiträge zur Kenntniss des Acalephenauges. "Morphologische Jahrbuch" 15, 21–60 (1889)
- Beiträge zur Kenntniss der holotrichen Ciliaten. Verlag von Theodor Fischer, Cassel 1889
- Bütschli O, Schewiakoff W. Ueber den feineren Bau der quergestreiften Muskeln von Arthropoden. "Biologisches Centralblatt" 11, 2, s. 33–39 (1891)
- Bemerkung zu der Arbeit von Professor Famintzin über Zoochlorellen. "Biologisches Centralblatt" 11, s. 475–476 (1891)
- Ueber die Geographische Verbreitung der Süsswasser-Protozoen. "Mémoires de l'Académie impériale des sciences de St. Petersbourg" VII, 41, 1–201 (1893), BHL.
- Ueber einige ekto- und entoparasitische Protozoen der Cyclopiden. "Bull. Soc. Impér. Natural. Moscou" 7, 1–29. + Pl. 1 (1893)
- Ueber einen neuen bacterienähnlichen Organismus des Susswassers. "Verhandlungen des Naturhistorisch-medizinischen Vereins zu Heidelberg" 5, s. 44–79 (1893)
- Ueber die Natur der sogenannten Exkretkörner der Infusorien. "Zeitschrift für wissenschaftliche Zoologie" 57, s. 32–56 + Pl. 3 (1894)
- Ein abnorm weiblicher Genital-Apparat von Ascaris lumbricoides L. "Centralblatt für Bakteriologie" 15 (13-14), s. 473-476 (1894)
- Ueber die Ursache der fortschreitenden Bewegung der Gregarinen. "Zeitschrift für wissenschaftliche Zoologie" 58, s. 340–354 (1894)
- A New Method of Staining Cilia, Flagella and Other Locomotor Organs of Protozoa. "Proceedings of the Fourth International Congress of Zoology" Cambridge 1898
- К биологии простейших. "Записки Императорской Академии Наук" том 75
- Организация и систематизация Infusoria Aspirotricha. "Mémoires de l'Académie impériale des sciences de St. Petersbourg" VIII, 4, 1–395
  - The structure and classification of the infusoria Aspirotricha (Holotricha auctorum) by W. Schewiakoff. Trans. by Prudence Winter Kofoid (1903)
- Beiträge zur Kenntniss der Radiolaria-Acanthometrea. "Mémoires de l'Académie impériale des sciences de St. Petersbourg" 12, 10 (1902)
- Acantharia. Fauna e Flora del golfo di Napoli. 2 vol. Stazione Zoologica di Napoli, monogr. No. 37, 1–755 (1896)
- Acantharia des Golfes von Neapel [w:] Fauna and Flora des Golfes von Neapel Monographie, Friedländer & Sohn, Berlin 1926
