= Otto Bütschli =

German biologist (1848–1920)

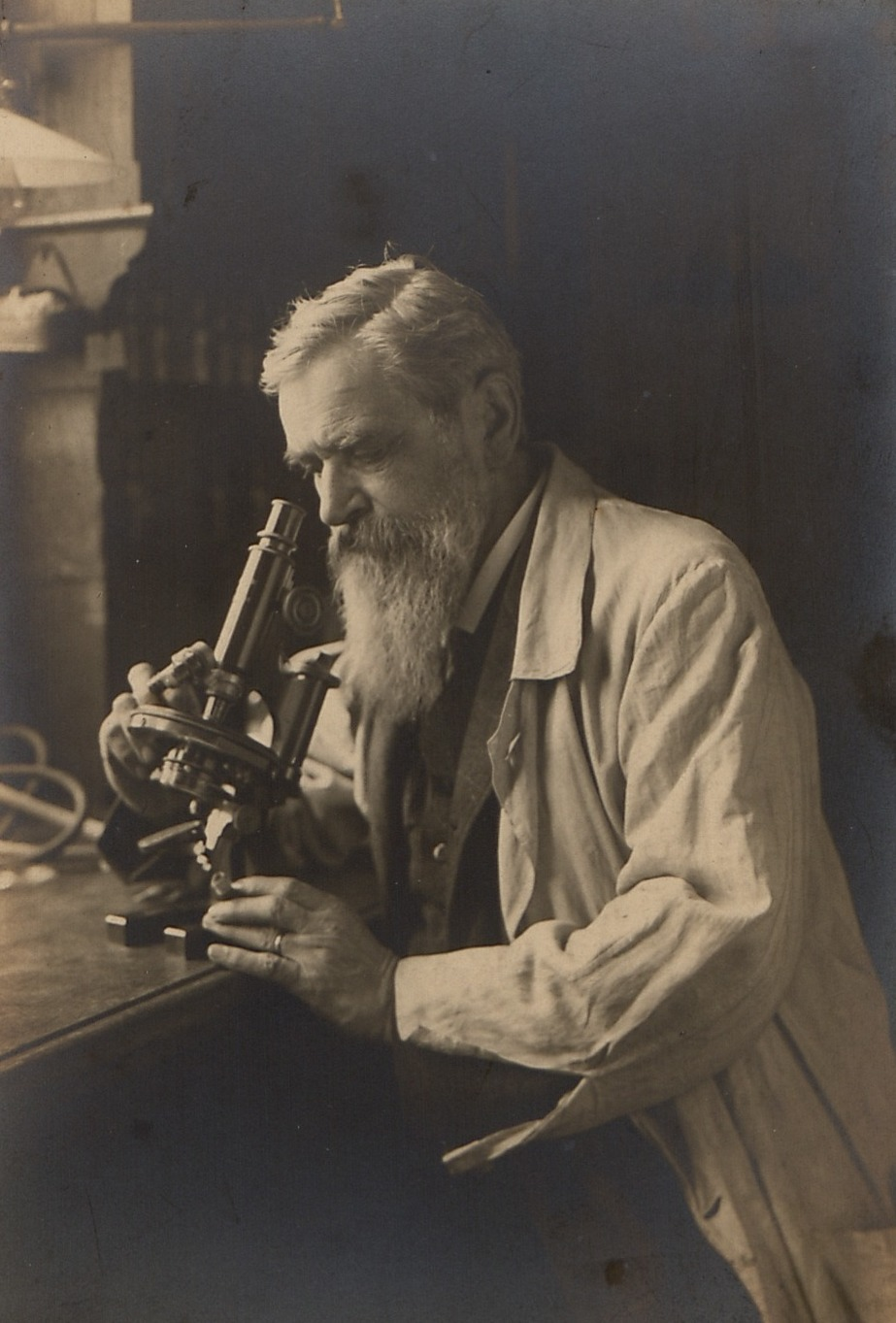
- Otto Bütschli in 1916
- Born: 3 May 1848; Frankfurt, German Confederation
- Died: 2 February 1920 (aged 71); Heidelberg, Germany
- Education: University of Heidelberg
- Known for: Recognizing the structures now known as chromosomes
- Awards: Linnean Medal (1914)
- Scientific career
- Fields: Invertebrate zoology
- Workplaces: University of Kiel, University of Heidelberg
- Doctoral advisor: Rudolf Leuckart
- Doctoral students: Wladimir Schewiakoff Richard Goldschmidt
- Author abbrev. (botany): Buetschli

Johann Adam Otto Bütschli (3 May 1848 – 2 February 1920) was a German zoologist and professor at the University of Heidelberg. He specialized in invertebrates and insect development. Many of the groups of protists were first recognized by him.

He was the first scientist to recognize the structures now known as chromosomes.

== Life ==
Bütschli was born in Frankfurt am Main. He studied mineralogy, chemistry, and paleontology in Karlsruhe and became assistant of Karl Alfred von Zittel (geology and paleontology). He moved to Heidelberg in 1866 and worked with Robert Bunsen (chemistry). He received his PhD from the University of Heidelberg in 1868, after passing examinations in geology, paleontology, and zoology. He joined Rudolf Leuckart at the University of Leipzig in 1869. After leaving his studies to serve as an officer in the Franco-Prussian War (1870–1871), Bütschli worked in his private laboratory and then for two years (1873–1874) with Karl Möbius at the University of Kiel. After that, he worked privately. In 1876, he made Habilitation. He became professor at the University of Heidelberg, as successor of Alexander Pagenstecher, in 1878. He held this position for over 40 years.
