= Vladyslav Monchenko =

Ukrainian zoologist and ecologist

Vladyslav Ivanovich Monchenko
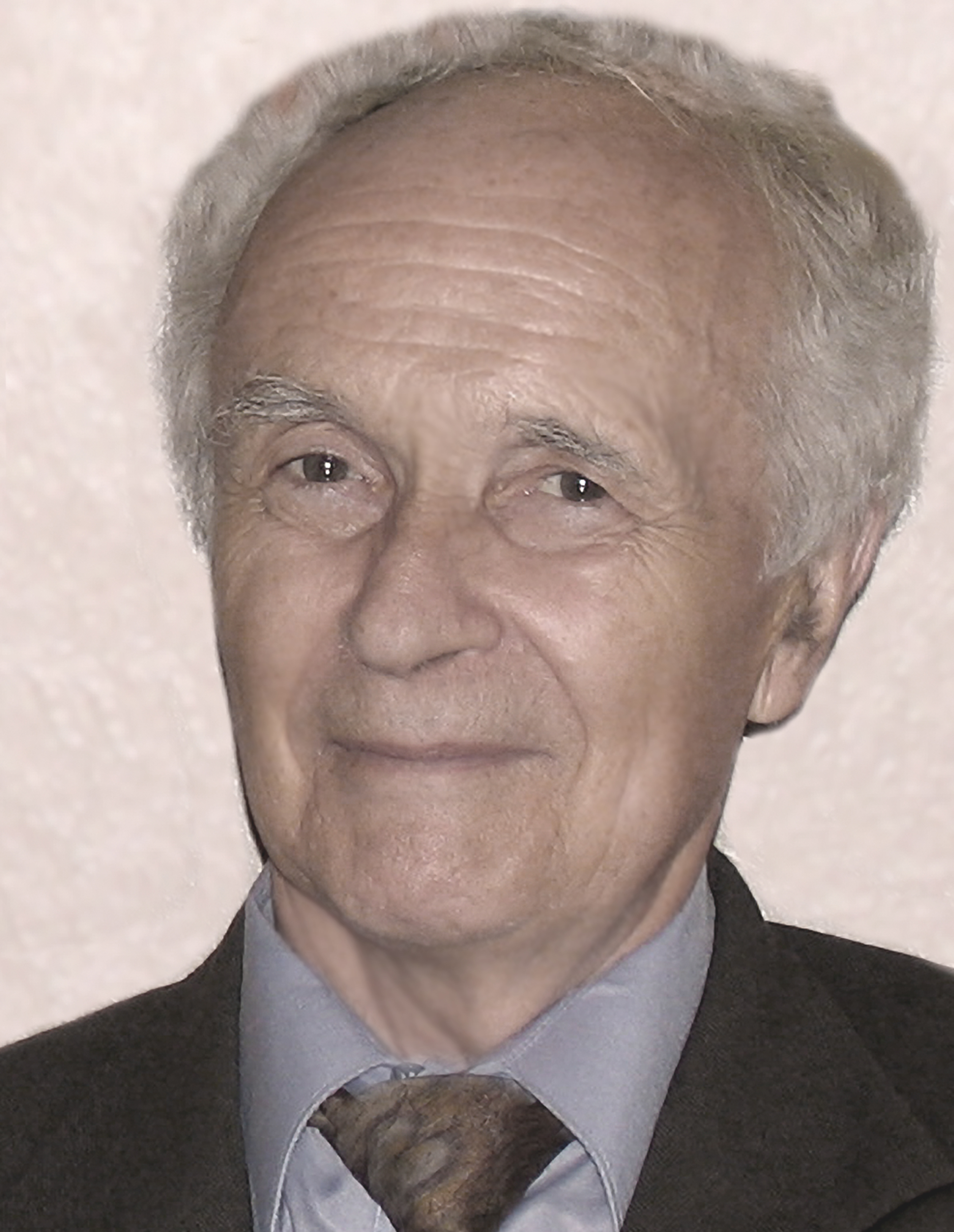
- Born: 2 April 1932; Moscow, USSR
- Died: 8 February 2016 (aged 83); Kyiv, Ukraine
- Education: Kyiv University
- Known for: Taxonomy, zoogeography, and ecology of Copepoda
- Awards: State Prize of Ukraine in Science and Technology (2007); Honored Worker of Science and Technology of Ukraine (2008); D. K. Zabolotny Prize of the AS UkrSSR (1976)
- Scientific career
- Fields: zoology, ecology, evolution, zoogeography, carcinology, protistology
- Workplaces: I. I. Schmalhausen Institute of Zoology
- Doctoral advisor: Aleksandr Markevich
- Doctoral students: Igor Dovgal, Vitaliy Anistratenko

Vladyslav Ivanovych Monchenko (Ukrainian: Владислав Іванович Монченко; 2 April 1932 – 8 February 2016) was a Ukrainian zoologist and ecologist, specializing in crustaceans. He was a full professor (1995), Doctor of Biological Sciences (1989), an Academician of the National Academy of Sciences of Ukraine (2003), an Honored Worker of Science and Technology of Ukraine (2008), and a laureate of the State Prize of Ukraine in Science and Technology (2007) and the D. K. Zabolotny Prize of the Academy of Sciences of the Ukrainian SSR (1976).

== Education ==
Monchenko studied at the Kyiv State University, at the Faculty of Biology (1950–1955). After graduating, he pursued postgraduate studies at the Institute of Zoology of the AS UkrSSR from 1955 to 1958.

== Career ==
Monchenko worked at the I. I. Schmalhausen Institute of Zoology of the National Academy of Sciences of Ukraine. For nearly 30 years, he headed the Department of Fauna and Systematics of Invertebrates, which he founded in 1975. He also served as Deputy Director of the Institute for Scientific Work for approximately 15 years. From 2004, he held the position of Chief Research Fellow in the same department.

From the mid-2000s, he taught courses in "Carcinology" and "History of the Animal World" at Kyiv University for several years.

== Research ==
Monchenko's primary research interests were the taxonomy, zoogeography, ecology, and fauna of free-living freshwater and marine crustaceans of the order Copepoda.

He described 22 species of crustaceans new to science, established 7 new genera, and one new subfamily.

In 1962, under the supervision of Academician Aleksandr Markevich, he defended his candidate's dissertation (PhD equivalent) at Kyiv State University on the taxonomy and biology of Copepoda in the Dnieper basin. In 1989, he earned the degree of Doctor of Biological Sciences at the Institute of Zoology of the AS UkrSSR, with a dissertation on free-living cyclopoid copepods of the Ponto-Caspian basin, covering their fauna, ecology, zoogeographical and morpho-evolutionary analysis, phylogeny, and systematics.

For approximately 40 years, Monchenko served on the editorial board of the monographic series Fauna of Ukraine. He was also a member of the editorial board of the journal Vestnik Zoologii.

He authored approximately 200 publications, including 7 monographs, one of which appeared in the Fauna of Ukraine series.

=== Doctoral students ===
Monchenko supervised approximately 10 doctoral dissertations on various groups of invertebrates, including those of:

- Igor Dovgal (ciliates; candidate's and doctoral dissertations, 1989, 2002)
- Vitaliy Anistratenko (marine gastropod molluscs; candidate's and doctoral dissertations, 1990, 2003)

== Awards ==
- 1976 – D. K. Zabolotny Prize of the Academy of Sciences of the Ukrainian SSR
- 2007 – State Prize of Ukraine in Science and Technology
- 2008 – Honored Worker of Science and Technology of Ukraine

== Species named in honour of Prof. Monchenko ==
Three genera and nine species of crustaceans have been named in honour of Monchenko, including:

- Monchenkiella Martínez Arbizu, 2001
- Monchenkocyclops Karanovic, Yoo & Lee, 2012
- Cryptocyclopina monchenkoi Karanovic, 2008
- Neocyclops monchenkoi Karanovic, 2008
- Nitocrella monchenkoi Borutzky, 1972
- Prehendocyclops monchenkoi Rocha, 2000

In 2015, a species of minor land snail from Madagascar, Boucardicus monchenkoi, was also named in his honour. Monchenko had collected its first known specimen during an expedition in 1991.

== Selected publications ==
=== Monographs ===
- Monchenko, V. I. (1974). Fauna of Ukraine. Vol. 27. No. 3. Gnathostome Cyclopoida, Cyclops (Cyclopidae). Kyiv: Naukova Dumka. 326 pp.
- Monchenko, V. I. (2003). Free-living Cyclopoida Copepoda of the Ponto-Caspian Basin. Kyiv: Naukova Dumka. 350 pp.
- Monchenko, V. I., Balan, P. H., & Trokhymets, V. M. (2011). Carcinology. Kyiv: Kyiv University Publishing Centre. 527 pp.

=== Selected articles ===
- Monchenko, V. I. (1986). The first endemic genus of copepod crustaceans (Copepoda, Cyclopidae) from the Caspian Sea. Zoologicheskii Zhurnal, 65(3), 333–340.
- Monchenko, V. I. (1998). The Ponto-Caspian zoogeographic complex of Cyclopoida in the Caspian, Azov and Black Seas. Journal of Marine Systems, 15, 421–424.
- Monchenko, V. I., & Von Vaupel Klein, J. C. (1999). Oligomerization in Copepoda Cyclopoida as a kind of orthogenetic evolution in the animal kingdom. Crustaceana, 72(3), 241–264.
- Monchenko, V. I. (2000). Cryptic species in Diacyclops bicuspidatus (Copepoda: Cyclopoida): evidence from crossbreeding studies. Hydrobiologia, 417, 101–107.
- Miracle, M., Alekseev, V., Monchenko, V., Sentandreu, V., & Vicente, E. (2013). Molecular-genetic-based contribution to the taxonomy of the Acanthocyclops robustus group. Journal of Natural History, 47, 863–888.
