= Valentin Dogiel =

Russian and Soviet zoologist

Valentin Alexandrovich Dogiel
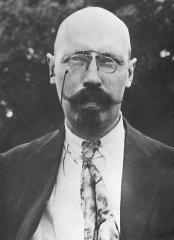
- Born: 11 March [O.S. 26 February] 1882; Kazan
- Died: 1 June 1955 (aged 73); Leningrad
- Scientific career
- Fields: zoology, parasitology
- Doctoral advisor: Vladimir Shevyakov
- Doctoral students: Aleksandr Markevich

Valentin Alexandrovich Dogiel (Russian: Валентин Александрович Догель; 11 March [O.S. 26 February] 1882 – Leningrad, 1 June 1955) was a Russian and Soviet zoologist, specialized in parasitology and protozoology. He has been considered the founder of evolutionary parasitology and was the author of an influential textbook of parasitology.

Dogiel was the son of noted histologist Alexander Dogiel. Valentin was born in Kazan. After his father moved from Tomsk to St. Petersburg in 1894, Valentin grew up and studied there. He then became a lecturer and in 1914 he became a professor at the St. Petersburg / Leningrad State University and head of the Laboratory of Protozoology at the Zoological Institute of the USSR Academy of Sciences, Leningrad, since 1944. In 1923 he founded the Laboratory of Parasitology at the Fisheries Research Institute VNIORKh in Leningrad.

Dogiel contributed significantly in the field of taxonomy of parasites and protozoa in general. He also worked on more general questions of comparative anatomy and zoology, and summarized this work in the book Oligomerization of Homologous Organs (1954) which he presented his new theory of the evolution of the Metazoa.

Dogiel's most famous work was the book Obshchaya protozoologiya (1951), also translated into English under the name General Protozoology in 1965. He was also the author of standard Soviet textbooks such as Invertebrate Zoology and Comparative anatomy of Invertebrates.

He was appointed a corresponding member of the USSR Academy of Sciences in 1939, and a foreign member of the Linnean Society of London in 1944.

== Works ==
- Dogiel, V. A. 1929. Polymerisation als ein Princip der progressiven Entwicklung bei Protozoen. Biologisches Zentralblatt 49: 451-469.
- Dogiel, V. A. 1936. Oligomerisation of homologous organs as one of the processes of evolution of animal organisms. Arhiv Anatomii, Gistologii i Embriologii 15: 101-114. (Олигомеризация гомологичных органов как один из процессов эволюции животных организмов. Арх анат гистол эмбриол. 15: 101-114)
- Dogiel, V. A. 1954. Oligomerization of the homologous organs as one of the main paths in animal evolution. Leningrad: Leningrad University Press [In Russian.] (Олигомеризация гомологичных органов как один из главных путей эволюции животных. — Л.: Изд-во ЛГУ, 1954. — 368 с.).

== See also ==
- Cecil Hoare
