= Anton Zhebrak =

Soviet botanist (1901–1965)

- Born: Anton Romanovich Zhebrak; 27 December 1901; Zelʹva District, Grodno Governorate, Russian Empire
- Died: 20 May 1965 (aged 64); Moscow, RSFSR, Soviet Union
- Education: Timiryazev Agricultural Academy; Institute of Red Professors
- Scientific career
- Fields: Botany, genetics
- Workplaces: Timiryazev Agricultural Academy; Moscow Institute of Pharmacology
- Author abbrev. (botany): Zhebrak

Anton Romanovich Zhebrak (Belarusian: Антон Раманавіч Жэбрак; 27 December 1901 – 20 May 1965) was a Soviet botanist, geneticist and professor.

== Career ==
He was born in to a peasant family. Zhebrak received his undergraduate degree from Timiryazev Agricultural Academy in 1925, then pursued a four year program in graduate studies at the Institute of Red Professors, graduating in 1929. The Institute of Red Professors was created by the Communist Party of the Soviet Union to address a shortage of Marxist professors, Zhebrak was one of just 236 graduates during the period 1924 to 1929. Zhebrak received a Rockefeller Fellowship, pursuing post-graduate studies at Columbia University in 1930–31.

From 1935 to 1948, Zhebrak was head of the genetics department at Timiryazev Agricultural Academy. Over the 1948–49 academic year, Zhebrak was a professor of botany at the Moscow Institute of Timber Industry. In 1949 he moved to the Academy of Medical Science's Institute of Pharmacology in Moscow, where he was a professor of botany until his death, in 1965.

Zhebrak had joined the Communist Party in 1928, during his graduate studies. As his scientific achievements continued through his career, this party membership reduced possible roadblocks within the Soviet academic community; by example, he had witnessed that 62 of the 69 professors at the Institute of Red Professors, during the last year of his graduate studies, were members of the Communist Party. In 1940, Zhebrak was granted membership in the Academy of Sciences of the Byelorussian SSR (serving as its president in 1947), and he served as an official of the Science Department of the Central Committee of the Communist Party of the Soviet Union in 1945–46. In 1996, Nikolai Krementsov published the book Stalinist Science, in which he cites Zhebrak, and others, as forces who found ways to bypass and even exploit the Party's political systems, creating more academic freedom than would otherwise have been allowed. This was not without its dangers. Zherbak was the president of the Academy of Sciences of the Byelorussian SSR from May to October 1947 but was removed from his office as he was one of numerous scientists targeted by an anti-cosmopolitan campaign in the immediate period after World War II.
