= Johannes Theodor Schmalhausen =

Russian botanist (1849–1894)

Johannes Schmalhausen
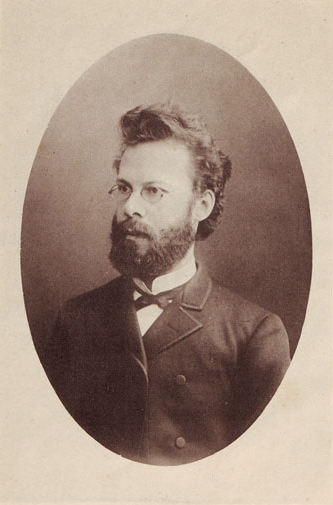
- Born: 1849; Saint Petersburg, Russian Empire
- Died: 1894 (aged 44–45)
- Known for: Flora yugo-zapadnoj Rossii (1886); Flora sredney i yuzhnoj Rossii, Kryma i Severnogo Kavkaza (1895-1897)
- Children: Ivan
- Scientific career
- Fields: Botanist
- Author abbrev. (botany): Schmalh.

Johannes Theodor Schmalhausen (Russian: Иван Фёдорович Шмальгаузен, romanized: Ivan Fyodorovich Shmalgauzen; 1849–1894) was a Russian botanist of German descent, known for his studies of East-European plants.

== Early life and education ==
Johannes Theodor Schmalhausen was born in Saint Petersburg. His father was a librarian at the Russian Academy of Sciences. In 1867 he graduated from the 4th Saint Petersburg (Larinsky) Gymnasium. Schmalhausen majored in botany at the University of St. Petersburg under Professor A. N. Beketov, and graduated with a magister degree in 1874. He was awarded the Gold Medal of the university for the botanical essay "On plant hybrids. Observations from St. Petersburg", was selected for a Professorial career and sent abroad from 1874 to 1876.

During his studies, Schmalhausen had come across Gregor Mendel's foundational 1865 paper on heredity, and Schmalhausen's dissertation was among the first ever to cite it—while Mendel was still alive—decades before Mendel's final rediscovery in 1900. For this earliest citation of Mendel, Schmalhausen wrote, in a footnote of his thesis, that Mendel had set out "to estimate with mathematical accuracy the number of forms having originated from hybrid pollination and the quantitative ratio of the individuals of these forms," and that Mendel "obtained complete series, the number of which can be represented as originating from a combination of several series [and Mendel found that] constant members with new combinations of traits are always obtained."

He studied in Strasbourg (with Heinrich Bary and Andreas Schimper), Zurich (with Oswald Heer), Vienna, Prague, Munich, Berlin, visited the Alps, Northern Italy and Southern France.

In 1877, he became a conservator at the herbarium of the Imperial Botanical Garden in Saint Petersburg and was ordained as a professor (Russian doctorate).

== Career ==
From 1878, he was associate professor at Vladimir University of Kiev and later professor of botany. For several years he was director of the botanical garden at the University of Kiev.

His youngest son was the evolutionary biologist Ivan Schmalhausen.

== Legacy ==
The genus Schmalhausenia (family Asteraceae) is named in his honor.

== Published works ==
- Beiträge zur Kenntnis der Milchsaftbehälter der Pflanzen, 1877.
- Beiträge zur Jura-Flora Russlands, 1879.
- Beiträge zur Tertiärflora Süd-West-Russlands, 1883.
- Tertiäre Pflanzen der Insel Neusibirien, 1890.

== Sources ==
- "Шмальгаузен, Иван Федорович" . Brockhaus and Efron Encyclopedic Dictionary (in Russian). 1906.
