= Ivan Schmalhausen =

Russian zoologist (1884–1963)

- Born: Иван Иванович Шмальгаузен; April 23, 1884; Kiev, Kiev Governorate, Russian Empire
- Died: October 7, 1963 (aged 79); Leningrad, Russian SFSR, Soviet Union
- Education: Kiev University
- Known for: stabilizing selection, modern synthesis, books "Factors of Evolution: the Theory of Stabilizing Selection" (1946) and "The Organism as a Whole in its Individual and Historical Development" (1938)
- Scientific career
- Fields: Zoologist, evolutionist
- Workplaces: Institute of Zoology (Kiev), Kiev University, University of Tartu, Moscow University, Institute of Evolutionary Morphology (Moscow), Zoological Institute (Leningrad)
- Doctoral advisor: Alexey Severtzov
- Doctoral students: Boris Balinsky

Ivan Ivanovich Schmalhausen (Russian: Ива́н Ива́нович Шмальга́узен; 23 April 1884 – 7 October 1963) was a Russian and Soviet zoologist and evolutionary biologist of German descent. He developed the theory of stabilizing selection, and took part in the development of the modern evolutionary synthesis.

He is remembered, among other things, for Schmalhausen's law, which states that a population at its limit of tolerance in one aspect is vulnerable to small differences in any other aspect.

== Early life and education ==
Ivan Ivanovich Schmalhausen was born in Kiev, Russian Empire (now Ukraine) on April 23, 1884, to Luise Schmalhausen (Luisa Ludwigovna Schmalhausen) and Johannes Schmalhausen (also transliterated as Ivan Fedorovich Schmalhausen, Иван Фёдорович Шмальгаузен). His father was one of the founders of Russian paleobotany.

In 1901, Schmalhausen graduated from the First Kiev Gymnasium and enrolled at Kiev University, but was expelled a year later after taking a part in student disturbances. In 1902 he resumed his university studies at Kiev in the faculty of biological science. Around 1902 he became acquainted with the founder of the Russian school of evolutionary morphology, Alexey Severtsov (1866–1936).

In 1904, Schmalhausen, under the guidance of Severtsov, completed his first scientific work on the embryonic development of lungs in the grass snake. He graduated from the university in 1909.

In 1910, he married Lydia Kozlova, a French language teacher at Kiev Women Gymnasium.

== Career ==
In 1912 Schmalhausen became a professor of zoology in Kiev University. From 1920–1930 he was head of the Department of Vertebrate Zoology. During 1930–1941 Schmalhausen was director of Institute of Zoology in Kiev, at the same during 1936–1948 he was director of Institute of Evolutionary Morphology in Moscow and during 1939–1948 - also a head to the Department of Darwinism in Moscow University. The Institute of Zoology in Kiev was later named in his honour the I. I. Schmalhausen Institute of Zoology.

He published his most well known book, Faktory Evolyutsii in 1946. This was translated into English by Isadore Dordick and edited by Theodosius Dobzhansky. This translation appeared as Factors of Evolution: The Theory of Stabilizing Selection in 1949.

On 23 August 1948, after the August 1948 Session of VASKhNIL, he became victim of order 1208, one of a series signed by Minister of Higher Education in the USSR, Sergei Kaftanov, which led to the mass dismissals of many university professors. This destroyed his career, as it removed his professorship and also decreed the destruction of his books and research projects. This action came about due to accusations of Weismannism and pro-Morganism, and of promoting the neo-Darwinian theory of evolution by natural selection, at a time when Trofim Lysenko and his followers were emphasising a process of heredity that focused on interaction with the environment and the inheritance of acquired characteristics along Lamarckian lines. (Lysenko put his theory into practice in agriculture, claiming to have improved wheat using Lamarckian techniques. Lysenkoism played a major role in Stalin's politics, stressing that hard work led to improvement in future generations.)

During these events in 1948 Schmalhausen was removed from the heading positions in Moscow institutions, Institute of Evolutionary Morphology and Department of Darwinism of Moscow University. Until the end of his life he worked in the Zoological Institute in Leningrad as a common senior researcher.

In 1955, Schmalhausen was one of the signatories of the "Letter of 300"—a collective letter by 300 scientists denouncing Lysenkoism.

He died on October 7, 1963, in Leningrad.

== Schmalhausen's law ==
Schmalhausen's law is a general principle that a population living at the boundary of its tolerance, in extreme or unusual conditions with regard to any aspect of its existence will be more vulnerable to small differences in any other aspect. Therefore, the variance of data is not simply noise interfering with the detection of so-called "main effects", but also an indicator of stressful conditions leading to greater vulnerability.
