= Bobrovsky Uyezd =

Bobrovsky Uyezd (Бобровский уезд) was one of the subdivisions of the Voronezh Governorate of the Russian Empire. It was situated in the northeastern part of the governorate. Its administrative centre was Bobrov.

== Demographics ==
At the time of the Russian Empire Census of 1897, Bobrovsky Uyezd had a population of 286,745. Of these, 83.2% spoke Russian, 16.5% Ukrainian, 0.1% Polish, 0.1% Romani and 0.1% Yiddish as their native language.
